This is an alphabetical list of aircraft engines by manufacturer.

0–9

2si

2si 215 
2si 230 
2si 430 
2si 460 
2si 500 
2si 540 
2si 690

3W
Source: RMV
3W 106iB2
3W-110
3W-112
3W-170
3W-210
3W-220

A

Abadal (Francisco Serramalera Abadal)

Abadal Y-12 350/400 hp

ABC

Source: Lumsden.
 ABC 8 hp
 ABC 30hp V-4 
 ABC 45hp V-6 
 ABC 60hp V-8 
 ABC 85hp V-6 
 ABC 100hp V-8 
 ABC 115 hp
 ABC 170hp V-12 
 ABC 225hp V-16 

ABC Dragonfly
ABC Gadfly
ABC Gnat
ABC Hornet
ABC Mosquito
ABC Scorpion
ABC Wasp
ABC type 10 APU
ABC type 11 APU

ABECO
Source: RMV
ABECO GEM

Aberg
Source: RMV
Type Sklenar

ABLE
Source: RMV, Able Experimental Aircraft Engine Co.  (Able Experimental Aircraft Engine Co., Altimizer, Hoverhawk (US))
ABLE 2275
ABLE 2500
ABLE VW x 2 Geared Drive

Accurate Automation Corp
Accurate Automation AT-1500
Accurate Automation AT-1700

Ace
(Ace American Engr Corp, Horace Keane Aeroplane Co, North Beach, Long Island NY.)
 Ace 1919 40hp

ACE
(American Cirrus Engine Inc)
Source: RMV
ACE Cirrus
ACE LA-1 19?? (ATC 31) = 140 hp 7RA. Evolved into Jacobs LA-1.
ACE Mk III 1929 (ATC 30, 44) = 90 hp 310ci 4LAI; (44) for 110 hp supercharged model.
ACE Mk III Hi-Drive
ACE Ensign

ACT
(Aircraft Cylinder and Turbine Co)
Source: RMV
 ACT Super 600

Adams
Source: RMV
Adams (UK) 4 Cylinder in-line of 140 HP
Adams (UK) 8 V

Adams-Dorman
Source: RMV
Adams-Dorman 60/80 HP

Adams-Farwell

The Adams Company, Dubuque, Iowa / F.O. Farwell, engines for gyrocopters
Adams-Farwell 36 hp 5-cyl rotary engine 
Adams-Farwell 50 HP
Adams-Farwell 55hp 5-cyl rotary 
Adams-Farwell 63hp 5-cyl rotary 
Adams-Farwell 72hp 5-cyl rotary 
Adams-Farwell 280hp 6cyl double rotary 
Adams-Farwell 6-cyl double rotary 
Adams-Farwell 10-cyl double rotary 
Adams-Farwell 14-cyl double rotary 
Adams-Farwell 18-cyl double rotary 
Adams-Farwell KM 11

ADC
ADC (from "Aircraft Disposal Company") bought 35,000 war-surplus engines in 1920. Initially produced engines from Renault 70 hp spares.

ADC Airdisco
ADC Cirrus
ADC Nimbus, development of Siddeley Puma
ADC Airsix, air-cooled version of Nimbus. Not put into use
ADC BR2
ADC Viper
ADC Airdisco-Renault

Adept-Airmotive
Source: RMV
Adept 280 N
Adept 300 R
Adept 320 T

Ader

Source: RMV
Ader Eole engine (Vapour)
Ader Avion engine (Vapour)
Ader 2V
Ader 4V

Adler

Source: RMV
Adler 50hp 4-cyl in-line 
Adler 100hp 6-cyl in-line 
Adler 222hp V-8

Adorjan & Dedics
Source: RMV
Adorjan & Dedics 2V

Advance Engines
Source: RMV
Advance 4V, 20/25 HP

Advanced Engine Design
Source: RMV
Advanced Engine Design Spitfire 1 Cylinder
Advanced Engine Design Spitfire 2 Cylinder
Advanced Engine Design Spitfire 3 Cylinder
Advanced Engine Design Spitfire 4 Cylinder
Advanced Engine Design K2-1000
Advanced Engine Design 110 HP (BMW Conversion)
Advanced Engine Design 220 LC
Advanced Engine Design 440 LC
Advanced Engine Design 660 LC
Advanced Engine Design 880 LC
Advanced Engine Design 530 (Kawasaki Conversion)

AEADC
(Aircraft Engine & Accessory Development Corporation)
Source: RMV
AEADC Gryphon M
AEADC Gryphon N
AEADC O-510 (Gryphon M)
AEADC O-810 (Gryphon N)

AEC
Source: RMV
AEC Keane

Aeolus Flugmotor
Source: RMV

Aerien CC
Source: RMV
Aerien 20/25 HP
Aerien 30 HP

Aermacchi

Source: RMV
Aermacchi MB-2

Aero & Marine
Aero & Marine 50 HP

Aero Adventure
Source: RMV
Aero Adventure GFL-2000

AeroConversions

AeroConversions AeroVee 2180

Aero Development
Source: RMV
(See SPEER)

Aero Engines Ltd.
(formerly William Douglas (Bristol) Ltd.) 
Aero Engines Dryad
Aero Engines Pixie
Aero Engines Sprite
Aero Engines inverted V-4
Aero Engines inverted V-6
 Douglas 750cc

Aero Motion
Source: RMV
Aero Motion 0-100
Aero Motion 0-101

Aero Motors
Source: RMV
Aero Motors Aerobat 150 HP

Aero Pixie
Source: RMV
Aero Pixie 153 cc, 2T

Aero Prag
Source: RMV
Aeroprag KT-422
Aeroprag AP-45
Aeroprag TP-422

Aero Products
(Aero Products Aeronautical Products Corp, Naugatuck CT.)
Source: RMV
Aero Products Scorpion 100 HP

Aero Sled
Source: RMV
Aero Sled Twin Flat, 20 HP

Aero Sport International
Source: RMV
Aero Sport International Wade Aero (WANKEL) 2 Types

AeroTwin Motors Corporation

AeroTwin AT972T

Aerojet
Aerojet produced rocket engines for missiles. It merged with Pratt & Whitney Rocketdyne.

Aerojet LR1 (Aerojet 25AL-1000)
Aerojet LR3 (Aerojet 25ALD-1000)
Aerojet LR5 (Aerojet X40ALD-3000)
Aerojet LR7 (Aerojet ZCALT-6000)
Aerojet LR9 (Aerojet X4AL-1000)
Aerojet LR13 (Aerojet X60ALD-4000 / Aerojet 4.104a / Aerojet 4.103a)
Aerojet LR15 (Aerojet XCNLT-1500)
Aerojet LR45 (Aerojet AJ24-1)
Aerojet LR49
Aerojet LR51
Aerojet LR53
Aerojet LR59 (CIM-99 Bomarc booster engine)
Aerojet LR87
Aerojet LR91
Aerojet-General SR19 (Aerojet Minuteman 2nd stage motor)
Aerojet 1KS-2800A
Aerojet 2KS-11000 (X102C1)
Aerojet 2KS-33000A
Aerojet 2.2KS-33000
Aerojet 2.5KS-18000 (X103C1)
Aerojet 5KS-4500
Aerojet 12AS-250 Junior
Aerojet 14AS-1000 (D-5) – RATO unit
Aerojet 15KS-1000 RATO unit
Aerojet 15NS-250
Aerojet 30AS-1000C – RATO unit
Aerojet 2.2KS-11000
Aerojet AJ10
Aerojet AJ-260 – largest solid-rocket motor ever built
Aerojet M-1
Aerojet Hawk motor (for Hawk SAM)
Aerojet Polaris motor
Aerojet Senior

Aeromarine Company
Source: RMV
Aeromarine Company D5-1 (Pulse-Jet)

Aeromarine

Aeromarine AL
Aeromarine NAL
Aeromarine S
Aeromarine S-12
Aeromarine AR-3
Aeromarine AR-3-40
Aeromarine AR-5
Aeromarine AR-7
Aeromarine AL-24
Aeromarine B-9
Aeromarine B-45 
Aeromarine B-90 
Aeromarine D-12 150 hp 
Aeromarine K-6 
Aeromarine L-6 130 hp 
Aeromarine L-6-D (direct drive)
Aeromarine L-6-G (geared)
Aeromarine L-8 192 hp 
Aeromarine RAD
Aeromarine T-6
Aeromarine U-6
Aeromarine U-6-D
Aeromarine U-8
Aeromarine U-8-873
Aeromarine U-8D
Aeromarine 85hp 1914
Aeromarine 90hp 
Aeromarine 100hp V-8

Aeromax
Source: RMV
Aeromax 100 I-F-B
Aeromax 100 L-D

Aeromotion
See: AMI

Aeromotor
(Detroit Aeromotor. Const. Co)
Source: RMV
Aeromotor 30hp 4-cyl in-line
Aeromotor 75hp 6-cyl in-line

Aeronamic
Source: RMV
Aeronamic ATS

Aeronautical Engineering Co.
Source: RMV
Aeronautical Engineering 9-cyl radial 200 HP

Aeronca

Aeronca E-107 (O-107)
Aeronca E-113 (O-113)

Aeroplane Motors Company
(Aeroplane Motors)
Source: RMV
Aeroplane 59hp V-8

Aeroprotech
Source: RMV
Aeroprotech VW 2.3

Aerosila

Source: RMV
Aerosila TA-4 FE
Aerosila 6 A/U
Aerosila 8 N/K
Aerosila 12
Aerosila 12-60
Aerosila 14 (-032,-130,-35)
Aerosila 18-100 (-200)
GTTP-300

Aerosport

Aerosport-Rockwell LB600

Aerostar

Source: RMV
Aerostar M14P
Aerostar M14V-26

Aerotech engines
Source: RMV
Aerotech 2 Cylinder 2T

Aerotech-PL
Source: RMV
Aerotech-PL EA81, Subaru conversion
Aerotech-PL VW conversion
Aerotech-PL BMW conversion
Aerotech-PL Suzuki conversion
Aerotech-PL Guzzi conversion

Aerotechnik

Source: RMV
Aerotechnik Tatra-100
Aerotechnik Tatra-102
Aerotechnik Hirth (Lic)
Aerotechnik Mikron (Lic)
Aerotechnik Tatra-714 (VW)

Aerotek
Source: RMV
Aerotek Mazda RX-7 (conversion)

AES
(See Rev-Air)

Affordable Turbine Power
Source: RMV
Affordable Turbine Power Model 6.5

AFR
Source: RMV
AFR BMW Conversion
AFR R 100 70/80 hp 
AFR R 1100D 90/100 hp
AFR R 1100S 98 hp 
AFR R 1150RT 95 hp
AFR R 1200GS 100 hp

Agilis
(Agilis Engines)
Sources: RMV
Agilis TF-800
Agilis TF-1000
Agilis TF-1200
Agilis TF-1400
Agilis TF-1500
Agilis TJ-60 (MT-60)
Agilis TJ-75
Agilis TJ-80
Agilis TJ-400

Agusta

Agusta GA.40
Agusta GA.70
Agusta GA.140
Agusta A.270
Turbomeca-Agusta TA.230

Ahrbecker Son and Hankers
Source: RMV
Ahrbecker Son and Hankers 10 HP
Ahrbecker Son and Hankers 20 HP
Ahrbecker Son and Hankers 1 Cylinder – vapor

AIC
(Aviation Ind. China. See Catic and Carec)

Aichi

Source:Gunston 1989 except where noted.
Aichi AC-1
Aichi Atsuta (Atsuta 31) – Licence-builtDaimler-Benz DB 601A for IJN
Aichi AE1A (Atsuta 21)
Aichi AE1P (Atsuta 32)
Aichi Ha-70 (Coupled Atsuta 30s)

AICTA
(AICTA Design Work, Prague, Czech Republic)
AICTA LMD 416-00R

Aile Volante
Aile Volante C.C.2
Aile Volante C.C.4

Air Repair Incorporated
Source: RMV
(Jacobs Licence)
Air Repair Incorporated L-4
Air Repair Incorporated L-5
Air Repair Incorporated L-6
(Jacobs-Page Licence)
Air Repair Incorporated R755

Air Ryder
Source: RMV
Air Ryder Subaru EA-81 (Conversion)

Air Technical Arsenal
Source: RMV
Air Technical Arsenal TSU-11
Air Technical Arsenal TR-30

Air-Craft Engine Corp
Source: RMV
Air-Craft Engine Corp LA-1

Aircat
(Detroit Aircraft Eng. Corp.)
Source: RMV
Aircat Radial 5 cylinders

Aircooled Motors
See: Franklin

Aircraft Engine Co
(Aircraft Engine Co Inc, Oakland, CA)
 Aircraft 1911 80hp

Aircraft & Ind. Motor Corp
(See Schubert)

AiResearch
See: Garrett, Allied Signal and Honeywell

Airex
Airex Rx2
Airex Rx10

Airmotive-Perito
See: Adept-Airmotive

Airship Aircraft Engine Company
Airship A-Tech 100 Diesel

Airtrike
(AirTrike GmbH i.L., Berlin, Germany)
Airtrike 850ti

AISA

Source: RMV
Ramjet on rotor

Aixro
Source: RMV
Aixro XF-40
Aixro XH-40
Aixro XP-40
Aixro XR-30
Aixro XR-40
Aixro XR-50

Ajax
Source: RMV
Ajax 7-cyl rotary
Ajax 6-cyl radial (2 rows of 3 cyls.), 80 HP

Akkerman
Akkerman Model 235 30 HP, special fuel

Akron
Funk E200
Funk E4L

Albatross
(Albatross Co Detroit)
Albatross 50hp 6-cyl radial 
Albatross 100hp 6-cyl radial

Aldasoro
Aldasoro aero engine

Alexander
Alexander 4-cyl
Alexanderradial 5-cyl

Alfa Romeo
 
Societa per Azioni Alfa Romeo

Romeo 600hp V-12
Alfa Romeo V-6 diesel
Alfa Romeo V-12 diesel
Alfa Romeo D2
Alfa Romeo 100 or RA.1100
Alfa Romeo 101 or RA.1101
Alfa Romeo 110/111
Alfa Romeo 115/116
Alfa Romeo 121
Alfa Romeo 122
Alfa Romeo 125/126/127/128/129/131
Alfa Romeo 135/136
Alfa Romeo 138 R.C.23/65
RA.1000 Monsone – licensed Daimler-Benz DB 601
Alfa Romeo RA.1050
Alfa Romeo RA.1100 or AR.100
Alfa Romeo RA.1101 or AR.101
Alfa Romeo AR.318
Alfa Romeo Dux
Alfa Romeo Jupiter – licensed Bristol Jupiter
Alfa Romeo Lynx/Lince – licensed Armstrong Siddeley Lynx
Alfa Romeo Mercury
Alfa Romeo Pegasus

Alfaro
Alfaro baby engine
Alfaro 155 hp 4-cyl barrel engine

Allen
Allen O-675

Alliance
(Aubrey W. Hess/Alliance Aircraft Corporation)
 Hess Warrior

Allied
Allied Monsoon Licensed manufacturer of French Règnier 4L

AlliedSignal

AlliedSignal TPE-331
Garrett TPF351
AlliedSignal LTS101
AlliedSignal ALF502/LF507

Allis-Chalmers
 
Source: Gunston
Allis-Chalmers J36

Allison

Allison V-1410 – Liberty L-12
Allison V-1650 – Liberty L-12
Allison V-1710
Allison V-3420
Allison X-4520
Allison 250 (T63)(T703)
Allison 252
Allison 504
Allison 545
Allison 550
Pratt & Whitney/Allison 578-DX
Allison J33 (Allison 400)
Allison J35 (Allison 450)
Allison J56
Allison J71
Allison J89
Allison J102
Allison T38
Allison T39
Allison T40 (Allison 500, 503)
Allison T44
Allison T54
Allison T56 (501-D)
Allison T61
Allison T63
Allison T71
Allison T78
Allison T80
Allison T406 (AE1107)
Allison T701 (Allison 501-M62)
Allison T703 (Allison 250)
Allison TF32
Allison TF41 (development of Rolls-Royce Spey)
Allison GMA 200
Allison GMA 500
Allison AE3010
Allison AE3012
Allison PD-37 Pyrodyne

Almen
Almen A-4

Alvaston
 Alvaston 20hp 2-cyl opposed 
 Alvaston 30hp 2-cyl opposed 
 Alvaston 50hp 4-cyl opposed

Alvis

Alvis Alcides
Alvis Alcides Major
Alvis Leonides
Alvis Leonides Major
Alvis Maeonides Major
Alvis Pelides
Alvis Pelides Major

American Cirrus Engine
See: ACE

American Engineering Corporation
Source: RMV
ACE Keane

American Helicopter
American Helicopter PJ49 Pulsejet
American Helicopter XPJ49-AH-3

American Motor & Aviation Co
American 1911 rotary
American S-5 radial

AMCEL
(AMCEL Propulsion Company)
 AMCEL controllable solid fuel rocket

AMI
(AeroMotion Inc.)
 AeroMotion Twin
AeroMotion O-100 Twin
AeroMotion O-101 Twin

AMT Netherlands
(Aviation Microjet Technology)
 AMT Olympus
 AMT Titan
 AMT Lynx

AMT USA
(AMT USA, LLC, Cincinnati)
 AMT-450

A.M.U.A.L
(Établissement A.M.U.A.L)
 A.M.U.A.L M.J.5 65° V-8 350 hp 
 A.M.U.A.L M.J.6 90° V-8 400 hp 
 A.M.U.A.L M.J.7 90° V-8 600 hp

Angle
Angle 100hp Radial

Ansaldo

 Ansaldo San Giorgio 4E-145 6I 300 hp
 Ansaldo San Giorgio 4E-150 6I 300 hp
 Ansaldo San Giorgio 4E-284 V-12 450 hp
 Ansaldo San Giorgio 4E-290 V-12 550 hp

Antoinette

Source:Gunston
Antoinette 32hp V-8 
Antoinette 46hp?
Antoinette 64hp V-16 
Antoinette 67hp V-8 
Antoinette 165hp V-16
Antoinette 134hp V-8 
Antoinette 55hp V-8
Antoinette V-32

Anzani
For British Anzani products see: British Anzani
Source:

Air-cooled Anzani engines

Anzani V-2
Anzani 3-cylinder fan engines
Anzani 14hp  
Anzani 15hp  
Anzani 24.5hp  
Anzani 31.6hp  
Anzani 42.3hp  
Anzani 10-12hp  
Anzani 12-15hp  
Anzani 25-30hp  
Anzani 30-35hp  
Anzani 40-45hp  
Anzani 45-50hp
Anzani 30hp 3-cyl radial 
Anzani 45hp 5-cyl radial
Anzani 60hp 5-cyl radial
Anzani 6-cylinder
Anzani 40-45hp radial 
Anzani 50-60hp radial 
Anzani 70hp radial 
Anzani 80hp radial 
Anzani 95hp 7-cyl radial
Anzani 10-cylinder
Anzani 60-70hp radial 
Anzani 100-110hp radial 
Anzani 95-100hp radial 
Anzani 125hp radial 
Anzani 125hp radial 
Anzani 200hp radial
Anzani 100hp 14-cyl radial 
Anzani 150-160hp 14-cyl radial 
Anzani 20 200hp 20-cyl radial 

Water-cooled Anzani engines
Anzani 30-32hp V-4 
Anzani 56-70hp V-4 
Anzani 600-700hp 20-cyl radial  In-line radial 10 banks of 2 cylinders
Anzani W-6
Anzani 6A3 (6-cyl radial 60 hp)

ARDEM
(Avions Roger Druine Engines M)
Ardem 4 CO2

Ares
(Ares ltd., Finland)
 Ares diesel Cirrus

Argus Motoren

Source:Gunston except where noted

 Argus Type I ("50hp") – 4-cyl. 50-70 hp )
 Argus Type II (4-cyl. 100 hp )
 Argus Type III (aka Argus 110 hp) – 6-cyl )
 Argus Type IV (aka 140/150hp) – 4-cyl. 140 hp )
 Argus Type V (6-cyl. 140 hp )
 Argus Type VI (6-cyl. 140 hp )
 Argus Type VII (6-cyl. 115-130 hp )
 Argus Type VIII (6-cyl. 190 hp ) 
Argus As I 4-cylinder, 100-hp, year 1913
Argus As II, 6-cylinder, 120-hp, year 1914
Argus As III 6-cylinder upright inline
Argus As 5 24-cylinder in-line radial (6 banks of four cylinders)
Argus As VI 700 hp V-12
Argus As VIA
Argus As 7 9R 700 hp
Argus As 8 4-cylinder inverted inline
Argus As 10 8-cylinder inverted V
Argus As 12 16H 550 hp
Argus As 16 4-cylinder horizontally-opposed 35 hp
Argus As 17
Argus As 014 (aka "Argus 109-014") – pulse jet engine for V-1 flying bomb and Tornado boat
Argus As 044
Argus As 16 4-cylinder inverted inline 40 hp
Argus As 17 6-cylinder inverted inline 225 hp / 285 hp
Argus As 401 development and renumbering of the As 10
Argus As 402
Argus As 410 12-cylinder inverted V
Argus As 411 12-cylinder inverted V
Argus As 412 24-cylinder H-block, prototyped
Argus As 413 – similar to 412, never built
Argus 109-044
Argus 115 hp 6-cylinder upright inline 
Argus 130 hp 6-cylinder upright inline 
Argus 145 hp 6-cylinder upright inline 
Argus 190 hp 6-cylinder upright inline

Argylls

a 120-130hp sleeve valve 6-cylinder exhibited at Olympia 1914

Armstrong Siddeley
Armstrong Siddeley was formed by purchase of Siddeley-Deasy in 1919.

Piston Engines
Armstrong Siddeley Terrier
Armstrong Siddeley Mastiff
Armstrong Siddeley Boarhound
Armstrong Siddeley Cheetah
Armstrong Siddeley Civet
Armstrong Siddeley Cougar
Armstrong Siddeley Deerhound
Armstrong Siddeley Genet
Armstrong Siddeley Genet Major
Armstrong Siddeley Hyena
Armstrong Siddeley Jaguar
Armstrong Siddeley Leopard
Armstrong Siddeley Lynx
Armstrong Siddeley Mongoose
Armstrong Siddeley Ounce
Armstrong Siddeley Panther
Armstrong Siddeley Puma – originally the Siddeley Puma
Armstrong Siddeley Serval
Armstrong Siddeley Tiger
Armstrong Siddeley Wolfhound – paper project of developed Deerhound
Gas turbines
Armstrong Siddeley Adder
Armstrong Siddeley ASX
Armstrong Siddeley Double Mamba
Armstrong Siddeley Mamba
Armstrong Siddeley Python
Armstrong Siddeley Sapphire
Armstrong Siddeley Viper
Rocket engines
 Armstrong Siddeley Alpha
 Armstrong Siddeley Beta
 Armstrong Siddeley Delta
 Armstrong Siddeley Gamma
 Armstrong Siddeley Screamer
 Armstrong Siddeley Snarler
 Armstrong Siddeley Spartan
 Armstrong Siddeley Stentor

Armstrong Whitworth

 Armstrong Whitworth 1918 30° V-12

Arrow SNC

Arrow 250
Arrow 270 AC
Arrow 500
Arrow 1000

Arsenal

Source:Gunston
Arsenal 213
Arsenal 12H
Arsenal 12H-Tandem
Arsenal 12K
Arsenal 24H
Arsenal 24H-Tandem

Asahina
 Asahina 9-cyl 100hp rotary

Ashmusen
(Ashmusen Manufacturing Company)
Ashmusen 1908 60hp 8HOA
Ashmusen 1908 105hp 12HOA

Aspin
(F.M. Aspin & Company)
Aspin Flat-Four

Aster
Aster 51hp 4-cylinder-line

Astrodyne
(Astrodyne Inc.)
 Astrodyne 16NS-1000
 Astrodyne XM-34 (ZELL booster)

ATAR
(Atelier Technique Aéronautique de Rickenbach – pre SNECMA take-over)
 ATAR 101
 ATAR 103
 ATAR 104 (Vulcain)
 ATAR 201
 ATAR 202
 ATAR 203

Atwood
(Atwood Aeronautic Company, Williamsport, PA / Harry N. Atwood)
Atwood 120-180hp V-12 ( bore x stroke
Atwood M-1 (1916)
Atwood M-2 (1916)
Atwood Twin Six

Aubier & Dunne
Data from:Italian Civil & Military Aircraft 1930–1945
Aubier & Dunne 2-cyl 17hp
Aubier & Dunne 3-cyl
Aubier-Dunne V.2D

Austin

 Austin V-12
 Austin rotary engine

Austro-Daimler

Source:Gunston
Austro-Daimler 35-40hp 4-cyl. (35-40 hp )
Austro-Daimler 65-70hp 4-cyl. (65-70 hp )
Austro-Daimler 90hp 6-cyl. (90 hp )
Austro-Daimler 120hp 6-cyl. (120 hp )
Austro-Daimler 160hp 6-cyl.
Austro-Daimler 185hp 6-cyl.
Austro-Daimler 200hp 6-cyl. (200 hp )
Austro-Daimler 210hp 6-cyl.
Austro-Daimler 225hp 6-cyl.
Austro-Daimler 300hp V-12
Austro-Daimler 360hp 6-cyl (360 hp )
Austro-Daimler 400hp V-12 (400 hp )
Austro-Daimler D-35 (400 hp )

Austro Engine

Austro Engine E4 (AE 300) 
Austro Engine AE50R
Austro Engine AE75R
Austro Engine AE80R
Austro Engine AE500
Austro Engine GIAE110R

Auto Diesels
 Auto Diesels STAD A250
 Auto Diesels STAD A260
 Auto Diesels LPI Mk.12A/L
 Auto Diesels LPI Mk.12A/T
 Auto Diesels LPI Mk.12A/D
 Auto Diesels GT15
 Auto Diesels 7660.001.020

Ava
(L'Agence General des Moteurs Ava)
 Ava 4A

Avco Lycoming
See:Lycoming

Avia

Aviadvigatel

Aviadvigatel PD-14
Aviadvigatel PS-90

Aviatik
Argus engines sold in France under the brand name 'Aviatik' by Automobil und Aviatik AG 

 Aviatik 70hp 4-cyl in-line 
 Aviatik 100hp 4-cyl in-line 
 Aviatik 150hp 4-cyl in-line

A.V. Roe

A.V. Roe 20hp 2-cyl.

Avro

Avro Alpha

Avro Canada

Avro Chinook
Avro Iroquois
Avro Orenda
Avro P.35 Waconda

Axelson

Axelson A-7-R 115hp
Axelson-Floco B 150hp

Axial Vector Engine Corporation
Dyna-Cam

Aztatl
 Aztatl 3-cyl radial
 Aztatl 6-cyl 80hp radial
 Aztatl 10-cyl radial

B

Bailey
Bailey C-7-R "Bull's Eye" 1927 = 140hp 7RA.

Bailey Aviation

Bailey B200
Bailey Hornet
Bailey V5 engine

Baradat–Esteve
(Claudio Baradat Guillé & Carlos Esteve)
 Baradat toroidal engine

Basse und Selve

Basse und Selve BuS. 120hp ( 120-130 hp)
Basse und Selve BuS.III 150 hp
Basse und Selve BuS.IV ( /  260 hp / 270 hp)
Basse und Selve BuS.IVa 300 hp

Bates

Data from:
Bates 29hp V-4

Bayerische
(Bayerische Motoren Gesellschaft)
 Bayerische 7-cyl 50hp rotary

Beardmore

Source: Lumsden

Beardmore 90 hp
Beardmore 120 hp 
Beardmore 160 hp 
Beardmore Pacific
Beardmore Simoon
Beardmore Cyclone
Beardmore Tornado
Beardmore 12-cyl opposed diesel
Beardmore Typhoon
Galloway Adriatic
Galloway Atlantic

Béarn
Construction Mécanique du Béarn/Société de Construction et d'Exploitation de Matériels et de Moteurs
 Béarn 6
 Béarn 12A
 Béarn 12B

Beatty

Beatty 40hp 4-cyl.()
Beatty 50hp 4-cyl.()
Beatty 60hp 4-cyl. (geared 0.66:1 )
Beatty 80hp 8-cyl. V-8

Beck
 Beck 1910 toroidal engine
 Beck 35hp 4cyl toroidal engine 
 Beck 50hp 4cyl toroidal engine 
 Beck 75hp 4cyl toroidal engine

Beecher
(B.L. Beecher Company, New Haven, Connecticut)
 Beecher 8HOA

Bell Aerosystems Company

Bell Model 117
Bell Model 8001
Bell Model 8048
Bell Model 8081
Bell Model 8096
Bell Model 8096-39
Bell Model 8096A
Bell Model 8096B
Bell Model 8096L
Bell Model 8247
Bell Model 8533
Bell LR67
Bell XLR-81
Bell XLR-81-BA-3
Bell XLR-81-BA-5
Bell XLR-81-BA-7
Bell XLR-81-BA-11
Bell XLR-81-BA-13
Bell Hustler
Bell Nike-Ajax engine

Bentley
W. O. Bentley
Bentley BR1 
Bentley BR2

Benz

Source:Gunston

Benz 195hp 
Benz FX 
Benz Bz.I (Type FB) 
Benz Bz.II (Type FD)
Benz Bz.III (Type FF) 
Benz Bz.IIIa 
Benz Bz.IIIav 
Benz Bz.IIIb 
Benz Bz.IV 
Benz Bz.IVa
Benz Bz.V 
Benz Bz.Vb 
Benz Bz.VI 
Benz Bz.VIv

Berliner

Berliner 6hp rotary helicopter engine

Bertin
 Bertin 50hp X-4
 Bertin 100hp X-8

Besler
See: Doble-Besler

Beaussier
(Moteurs Beaussier)
 Beaussier 4-cyl

Bessonov
(A. A. Bessonov)
 Bessonov MM-1

Better Half
Better Half VW

Beardmore Halford Pullinger (B.H.P.)

Atlantic
230 hp – built by Galloway and Siddeley-Deasy developed into Siddeley Puma

Binetti
 Binetti B-300

Blackburn

Includes engines of Cirrus Engine Division of Blackburn
Source: Lumsden
Blackburn Cirrus – originally ADC Cirrus, 
Blackburn Cirrus Midget
Blackburn Cirrus Minor
Blackburn Cirrus Major
Blackburn Cirrus Bombardier
Blackburn Cirrus Grenadier
Blackburn Cirrus Musketeer
Blackburn Nimbus
Blackburn Artouste – licence built Turbomeca Artouste
Blackburn Turbomeca Palouste – Turbomeca Palouste
Blackburn Turbomeca Palas – Turbomeca Palas
Blackburn Turbomeca Turmo – Turbomeca Turmo
Blackburn A.129

Blackburne

Blackburne Tomtit
Blackburne Thrush

Bliss
(E.W. Bliss Company)
 Bliss Jupiter
 Bliss Neptune
 Bliss Titan

Bloch

 Bloch 4B-1
 Bloch 6B-1

BMW

Source: Gunston except where noted

BMW Sytlphe 5-cyl rotary 
BMW III
BMW IIIa
BMW IV
BMW V
BMW Va
BMW VI
BMW VIIa
BMW VIII
BMW IX
BMW X
BMW XI
BMW 003 axial-flow turbojet
BMW 112 12-cylinder, (prototype)
BMW 114
BMW 116
BMW 117
BMW 132
BMW 139
BMW 801
BMW 802
BMW 803
BMW 804
BMW 805
BMW 109-002 (Bramo 109-002)
BMW 109-003
BMW 109-018
BMW 109-028
BMW 109-510
BMW 109-511
BMW 109-528
BMW 109-548
BMW 109-558
BMW 109-708
BMW 109-718
BMW P-3306
BMW P-3307
BMW MTU 6011
BMW 6002
BMW 6011
BMW 6012 (MTU 6012) 
BMW 8025
BMW 8026
BMW GO-480-B1A6
BMW-Lanova 114 V-4 9-cyl. radial diesel engine
BMW M2 B15 – 2 cyl. air-cooled boxer

Boeing

Source:Pelletier  except where noted
Boeing T50
Boeing T60
Boeing 500
Boeing 502
Boeing 514
Boeing 520
Boeing 540   gas turbine engine (turboprop)
Boeing 550
Boeing 551   gas turbine engine (turboprop)
Boeing 553   gas turbine engine (turboprop)

Boitel

 Boitel soleil

Boland

Boland V-8

Bonner
(Aero Bonner Ltd.)
Bonner Super Sapphire

Borzecki
(Jozef Borzecki)
Borzecki 2RB
Borzecki JB 2X250

Botali
Botali Diesel – eight-cylinder air-cooled 118 hp

Bramo

Source:Gunston except where noted
Bramo Sh.14A
Bramo 301
Bramo 314
Bramo 322
Bramo 323 Fafnir
Bramo 325
Bramo 328
Bramo 329 Twin Fafnir
Bramo 109-002
Bramo 109-003

Brandner

Brandner E-300

Breda

 Breda 320hp V-8

Breguet-Bugatti
Breguet-Bugatti U.16
Breguet-Bugatti U.24
Breguet-Bugatti U.24bis
Breguet-Bugatti Quadrimotor Type A
Breguet-Bugatti Quadrimotor Type B
Breguet-Bugatti H-32B

Breitfeld & Danek
Breitfeld & Danek Perun I 6-cylinder 170 hp
Breitfeld & Danek Perun II 6-cylinder 276 hp
Breitfeld & Danek BD-500 500 hp
Breitfeld & Daněk Hiero IV
Breitfeld & Daněk Hiero L
Breitfeld & Daněk Hiero N

Breese

 Breese 40hp 3-cyl radial

Breuer
(Breuer Werke G.m.b.H.)
Breuer 9-091
Breuer 9-094

Brewer
(Captain R.W.A. Brewer)
 Brewer Type M Gryphon O-8
 Brewer 250hp O-12
 Brewer 500hp X-16

Briggs & Stratton

Briggs & Stratton Vanguard Big Block V-Twin

Bristol Engine Company (Bristol)
Division of Bristol Aeroplane Company formed when Cosmos Engineering was taken over in 1920. Became Bristol Aero Engines in 1956. Merged with Armstrong Siddeley in 1958 to form Bristol Siddeley.
Sources: Piston engines, Lumsden, gas turbine and rocket engines, Gunston.

Bristol Aquila
Bristol Centaurus
Bristol Coupled Centaurus
Bristol Cherub
Bristol Draco – fuel injected Pegasus radial
Bristol Hercules
Bristol Hydra
Bristol Jupiter – originally Cosmos Jupiter
Bristol Lucifer
Bristol Mercury
Bristol Neptune
Bristol Olympus
Bristol Orion – Jupiter variant
Bristol Orion sleeve-valve
Bristol Orion (BE.25) turbo-prop/shaft
Bristol Orpheus
Bristol Pegasus (radial engine)
Bristol BE53 Pegasus (later, BS53 the Harrier engine)
Bristol Perseus
Bristol Phoebus
Bristol Phoenix diesel radial
Bristol Proteus – turboprop
Bristol Taurus
Bristol Theseus – turboprop
Bristol Thor – ramjet
Bristol Titan – 5-cylinder radial

Ramjets

Bristol BE.25
Bristol BRJ.1 6in ramjet, Initial development model using Boeing combustor.
Bristol BRJ.2 16in ramjet. Scaled up BRJ1 with Boeing combustor.
Bristol BRJ.2/5 16in M2 ramjet. Used on early Red Duster. Known to the MoS as BT.1 Thor
Bristol BRJ.3 16in M2 ramjet. Fitted with NGTE combustor and used on XRD.
Bristol BRJ.4/1 16in M2 ramjet. Used on early Red Duster and Bloodhound I. Known to the MoS as BT.2 Thor
Bristol BRJ.5/1 16in M2 ramjet. Used on Bloodhound II. Became BT.3 Thor
Bristol BRJ.601 16in M3 ramjet. Tested on Bobbin.
Bristol BRJ.701 23in M3 ramjet project study.
Bristol BRJ.801
Bristol BRJ.801 18in M3 ramjet. Initial M3 ramjet developed for Stage 1 Blue Envoy.
Bristol BRJ.811 18in M3 ramjet. M3 ramjet developed for Stage 1 Blue Envoy.
Bristol BRJ.824 18in M3 ramjet. Cancelled with Blue Steel Mk2.

Bristol Siddeley
Bristol Siddeley was formed by Bristol taking over Armstrong Siddeley , rebranding several of the engines. It took over de Havilland engines and, in turn, became a division of Rolls-Royce Limited.

Bristol Siddeley BE.58
Bristol Siddeley Pegasus (BE.53
Bristol Siddeley BS.59
Bristol Siddeley BS.100
Bristol Siddeley BS.143
Bristol Siddeley BS.347
Bristol Siddeley BS.358
Bristol Siddeley BS.360 -ex de Havilland, finalised as Rolls-Royce Gem
Bristol Siddeley BS.605
Bristol Siddeley BS.1001 Bristol Siddeley M2.4 – 4.2 ramjet.
Bristol Siddeley BS.1002 Bristol Siddeley M4.5 ramjet.
Bristol Siddeley BS.1003 Odin Bristol Siddeley M3.5 ramjet, Odin.
Bristol Siddeley BS.1004 Bristol Siddeley M2.3 ramjet.
Bristol Siddeley BS.1005
Bristol Siddeley BS.1006 Bristol Siddeley M4 research ramjet. Became R.2 research engine.
Bristol Siddeley BS.1007
Bristol Siddeley BS.1008 Bristol Siddeley M1.2 ramjet.
Bristol Siddeley BS.1009 Bristol Siddeley M3 ramjet. Modified BT.3 Thor intended for proposed Bloodhound III. Modified nozzle, intake and diffuser.
Bristol Siddeley BS.1010
Bristol Siddeley BS.1011 Rated at 40000 lb (177.9KN).
Bristol Siddeley BS.1012 Bristol Siddeley combination powerplant for APD 1019 and P.42. Used Olympus or BS.100 turbomachinery, bypass duct burning and ramjets.
Bristol Siddeley BS.1013 Bristol Siddeley ramjet study for stand-off missile. Possibly for Pandora.
Bristol Siddeley/SNECMA M45G
Bristol Siddeley/SNECMA M45H
Bristol Siddeley Gamma (for Black Knight)
Bristol Siddeley Gnome – ex de Havilland
Bristol Siddeley Gyron Junior ex de Havilland
Bristol Siddeley Stentor – Ex Armstrong-Siddeley
 Bristol Siddeley Double Spectretwo stacked de Havilland Spectres
Bristol Siddeley PR.23
Bristol Siddeley PR.37
Bristol Siddeley Artouste – licence-built Turbomeca Artouste
Bristol Siddeley Cumulus
Bristol Siddeley Nimbus
Bristol Siddeley Orpheus
Bristol Siddeley Palouste – licence-built Turbomeca Palouste
Bristol Siddeley Sapphire – ex Armstrong Siddeley
Bristol Siddeley Spartan I
Bristol Siddeley T64 (T64-BS-6)
Bristol Siddeley Viper
Bristol Siddeley BSRJ.801
Bristol Siddeley BSRJ.824
Bristol Siddeley NRJ.1
Bristol Siddeley R.1 Bristol Siddeley research ramjet.
Bristol Siddeley R.2 Bristol Siddeley research ramjet.

British Anzani
For French Anzani engines see: Anzani
British Anzani 35hp 2-cyl.
British Anzani 45hp 6-cyl.
British Anzani 60hp 6-cyl.
British Anzani 100hp 10-cyl.

British Salmson

British Salmson AD.3
British Salmson AC.7
British Salmson AC.9
British Salmson AD.9
British Salmson AD.9R srs III
British Salmson AD.9NG

British Rotary
British Rotary 100hp 10-cyl. rotary

Brooke
(Brooke, Chicago)
 Brooke 85hp 10-cyl. rotary
 Brooke 24hp 6-cyl. rotary
 Brooke Multi-X

Brott
(A. Brott, Denver, Colorado)
 Brott 35hp V-4 air-cooled
 Brott 45hp V-4 water-cooled
 Brott 60hp V-8 air-cooled

Brouhot
Brouhot 60hp V-8

Brownback
(Brownback Motor Laboratories Inc.)
Brownback C-400 (Tiger 100)

Bucherer
Bucherer 2-cyl rotary

Buchet

Buchet 6 in-line
Buchet 8-12hp 3-cyl inline
Buchet 24hp 6-cyl radial

Bücker

Bücker M 700

Budworth
(David Budworth Limited)
 Budworth Puffin
 Budworth Brill
 Budworth Buzzard

Bugatti

Bugatti 8
Bugatti U-16
Bugatti Type 14
Bugatti Type 34 U-16
Bugatti Type 50B
Bugatti Type 60

Burgess-White
(W. Starling Burgess, Rollin H. White / Burgess Company of Marblehead, MA and White Company of Cleveland, OH)
 Burgess-White X-16

Burlat

(Société des Moteurs Rotatifs Burlat)

 Burlat 8cyl. 35hp rotary –  at 1800 rpm, . . 6 500F
Burlat 8cyl. 60hp rotary –  at 1800 rpm, 11000F
Burla 8cyl. 75hp rotary –  at 1800 rpm, 11000F
Burlat 16cyl. 120hp rotary – p at 1750 rpm, 22000 F

Burnelli

 Burnelli AR-3

Burt
(Peter Burt)
 Burt 180hp V-12

C

CAC

CAC R-975 Cicada
CAC R-1340
CAC R-1830
CAC Merlin

CAE
See:Teledyne CAE

Caffort
(Anciens Etablissements Caffort Frères)
 Caffort 12Aa

Cal-Aero
(Cal-aero Institute, California)
 Cal-Aero Project

Call
(Henry L. Call)
 Call E-1 2OW
 Call E-2 4OW

CAM
(Canadian Airmotive Inc.)
 CAM TURBO 90

Canton-Unné
 Canton-Unné X-9

Cameron
(Cameron Aero Engine Division / Everett S. Cameron)
 Cameron C4-I-E1
 Cameron C6
 Cameron C12

Campini

Source:Gunston
Secondo Campini thermojet

CANSA
(Fabbrica Italiana Automobili Torino – Costruzioni Aeronautiche Novaresi S.A.)
CANSA C.80

Carden Aero Engines

Source:Ord-Hume.
Carden-Ford 31hp 4-cyl.
Carden-Ford S.P.1

CAREC
(China National Aero-Engine Corporation)
CAREC WP-11

Casanova
(Ramon Casanova)
 Casanova pulse-jet

Cato
 Cato 35hp 2-cyl 2OA
 Cato 60hp 4-cyl 4IL
 Cato C-2 75 hp 2OA

Caunter

Caunter B
Caunter C
Caunter D

Centrum
 Centrum 150hp 6-cyl radial

Ceskoslovenska Zbrojovka

Data from:
Ceskoslovenska Zbrojovka ZOD 260-B 2-stroke radial diesel engine – 260 hp

CFM International

CFM International CFM56
CFM International LEAP
CFM International RISE

Chaise
(Societe Anonyme Omnium Metallurgique et Industriel / Etablissements Chaise et Cie) 
 Chaise 12hp V-2
 Chaise 30hp V-4
 Chaise 4A 101 hp
 Chaise 4B 120 hp (14° inverted V-4)
 Chaise 4Ba
 Chaise AV.2

Chamoy
(M. Fernand Chamoy)
 Chamoy 5-cyl radial

Chamberlin
Chamberlin L-236
Chamberlin L-267

Changzhou
(Changzhou Lan Xiang Machinery Works)
Changzhou WZ-6

Charomskiy
Source:Gunston
Charomskiy AN.1
Charomskiy ACh-30
Charomskiy ACh-31
Charomskiy ACh-32
Charomskiy ACh-39
Charomskiy M-40

Chelomey
Chelomey D-3 Pulse-jet
Chelomey D-5 Pulse-jet
Chelomey D-6 Pulse-jet
Chelomey D-7 Pulse-jet

Chenu
 Chenu 50-65hp 4-cyl DD 
 Chenu 75hp 6-cyl in-line 
 Chenu 90hp 4-cyl GD 
 Chenu 80-90hp 6-cyl DD
 Chenu 80-90hp 6-cyl GD
 Chenu 200-250hp 6-cyl DD  (for dirigibles)

Chengdu

Chengdu WS-18

Chevrolair
(The Arthur Chevrolet Aviation Motors Corporation)
 Chevrolair 1923 Water-cooled in-line 4 upright
 Chevrolair D-4
 Chevrolair D-6
 Chevrolair 1923 Air-cooled in-line 4 upright and inverted

Chevrolet

 Chevrolet Turbo-Air 6 engine

Chinese aero-engines

Chotia
Chotia 460

Christoffersen
(Christoffersen Aircraft Company)
 Christoffersen 120hp 6-cyl in-line
 Christoffersen 120hp V-12

Chrysler

Chrysler IV-2220
Chrysler T36D

Church
(Jim Church)
 Church J-3 Marathon
 Church V-248 V-8

Cicaré

Cicaré 4C2T

Cirrus

Cirrus I
Cirrus II
Cirrus III
Cirrus Hermes
Cirrus Major
Cirrus Minor

Cisco Motors
Cisco Snap 100

Citroën

 Citroen 2cyl Citroën 2CV – 18 hp
 Citroen 4cyl Citroën GS 1.2 – 65 hp at 5,700 rpm

Clapp's Cars
 Clapp's Cars Spyder Standard

Clément-Bayard

Data from:
Clément-Bayard 30hp 2-cyl HOW 
Clément-Bayard 29hp 4-cyl in-line 
Clément-Bayard 40hp 4-cyl in-line 
Clément-Bayard 100hp 4-cyl in-line 
Clément-Bayard 118.5hp 4-cyl in-line 
Clément-Bayard 117.5hp 6-cyl in-line 
Clément-Bayard 250hp 6-cyl in-line  (for dirigibles)
Clément-Bayard 50hp 7-cyl Radial 
Clément-Bayard 300hp 8-cyl in-line  (for airships)
Clément-Bayard V-16 (for airships)

Cleone
 Cleone 1930 25hp 2-cyl hor opp 2 stroke

Clerget
(Société Clerget-Blin et Cie / Pierre Clerget)

Source:Lumsden except where noted

Clerget 50hp 7-cyl water-cooled radial (1907)
Clerget 50hp 4-cyl 
Clerget 100hp 4-cyl 
Clerget 200hp V-8 
Clerget 2K 16 hp 
Clerget 4V 40 hp 4-cyl in-line water-cooled (1908)
Clerget 4W 40 hp 4-cyl in-line water-cooled (1910)
Clerget 7Y 60 hp 
Clerget 7Z 
Clerget 9A (Diesel radial engine)
Clerget 9B 
Clerget 9Bf British version of 9B 140 hp 
Clerget 9C
Clerget 9F 
Clerget 9J 100 hp 
Clerget 9Z 110 hp
Clerget 11A 200 hp variable compression
Clerget 11Eb 
Clerget 11G 250 hp  5.7:1 compression
Clerget 14D
Clerget 14E
Clerget 14F (Diesel radial engine)
Clerget 14Fcs
Clerget 14F1
Clerget 14F2
Clerget 14U
Clerget 16H diesel V-16 (180x200=81.43L) 
Clerget 16SS diesel
Clerget 16X 
Clerget 18 rotary 300 hp
Clerget 32 diesel
Clerget Type Transatlantique (H type)
Clerget monocylinder powder powdered coal test engine
Clerget monocylinder 2x variable compression
Clerget monocylinder 4x variable compression
Clerget 180-2T V-8 2x variable compression
Clerget 180-4T V-8 4x variable compression
Clerget 100hp diesel 1928 9-cyl. radial
Clerget 200hp diesel 1929 9-cyl. radial
Clerget 250hp diesel 9-cyl. radial
Clerget 300hp diesel 9-cyl. radial

Cleveland
(Walter C. Willard / Cleveland Aero Engines)
 Cleveland 150hp 6-cyl axial engine 6x

Cleveland
(Cleveland Engineering Laboratories Company)
 Cleveland Weger 400hp 6-cyl 2-stroke radial

C.L.M.
(Compagnie Lilloise de Moteurs S.A)
Lille 6As 6-cyl opposed piston 2-stroke diesel (Junkers Jumo 205 licence built)
Lille 6Brs (600 hp)

CMB
(Construction Mécanique du Béarn)
See: Béarn

CNA

CNA C.II
CNA C.VI I.R.C.43
CNA C.7
CNA D.4
CNA D.VIII

Coatalen

Source:Brew 
Coatalen 12Vrs-2 diesel

Colombo
Colombo C.160
Colombo D.110
Colombo E.150
Colombo S.53
Colombo S.63

Combi
 Combi 150hp 6-cyl

Comet
(Comet Engine Corp, Madison WI.)
Comet 130hp
Comet 5
Comet 7-D 1928 (ATC 9) = 150 hp 612ci 7RA. 
Comet 7-E 1929 (ATC 47) = 165 hp 612ci 7RA.
Comet 7-RA 1928 (ATC 9) = 130 hp 7RA.

Compagnie Lilloise de Moteurs
See:C.L.M.

Conrad
(Deutsche Motorenbau G.m.b.H. / Robert Conrad)
Conrad C.III – (licence built by N.A.G. as the C.III N.A.G.)

Continental

Continental 140
Continental 141
Continental 142
Continental 160
Continental 210
Continental 217
Continental 219
Continental 220
Continental 227
Continental 320
Continental 324
Continental TS-325
Continental 327
Continental 352
Continental 354
Continental 356
Continental 420
Continental 500
Continental TP-500
Continental A40
Continental A50
Continental A65
Continental A70
Continental A75
Continental A80
Continental A90
Continental A100
Continental C75
Continental C85
Continental C90
Continental C115
Continental C125
Continental C140
Continental C145
Continental C175
Continental CD175 Thielert Centurion diesel engines 2010s
Continental CD300 Thielert Centurion diesel engines 2010s
Continental E165
Continental E185
Continental E225
Continental E260
Continental GR9-A
Continental GR18
Continental GR36
Continental Tiara 4-180
Continental Tiara 6-260
Continental Tiara 6-285
Continental Tiara 6-320
Continental Tiara 8-380
Continental Tiara 8-450
Continental Voyager 200
Continental Voyager 300
Continental Voyager 370
Continental Voyager 550
Continental O-110
Continental O-170
Continental O-190
Continental O-200
Continental O-240
Continental O-255
Continental O-270 (Tiara)
Continental O-280
Continental O-300
Continental O-315
Continental IO-346
Continental O-360
Continental O-368 (4cyl. O-550)
Continental O-405 (Tiara)
Continental O-470
Continental O-520
Continental O-526
Continental O-540 (Tiara)
Continental O-550
Continental OL-200
Continental OL-370
Continental-Honda OL-370
Continental OL-550
Continental OL-1430
Continental V-1650 (Merlin)
Continental V-1430
Continental IV-1430
Continental I-1430
Continental XH-2860
Continental R-545
Continental R-670
Continental R-975
Continental W670
Continental TD-300
Continental Model R-20
Continental J69
Continental J87
Continental J100
Continental RJ35 Ramjet
Continental RJ45 Ramjet
Continental RJ49 Ramjet
Continental T51
Continental T65
Continental T67
Continental T69
Continental T72
Continental Titan X340
Continental Titan X320
Continental Titan X370

Cors-Air
(Cors-Air srl, Barco di Bibbiano, Italy)
Cors-Air M19 Black Magic
Cors-Air M21Y
Cors-Air M25Y Black Devil

Corvair

(conversions and derivatives of the Chevrolet Turbo-Air 6 engine)
 AeroMax Aviation AeroMax 100
 Clapp's Cars Spyder Standard
 Magsam/Wynne (Del Magsam / William Wynne)

Cosmos Engineering

Cosmos Jupiter
Cosmos Lucifer
Cosmos Mercury
Cosmos Hercules 1,000 hp – 18x

Coventry Victor

Coventry Victor Neptune

Crankless Engines Company
(Anthony Michell)
Michell XB-4070

C.R.M.A.
(Société de construction et de Reparationde Materiel Aéronautique)
C.R.M.A. Type 102

Curtiss

Curtiss 250hp V-12 1649 cu in AB?
Curtiss 25-30hp
Curtiss A-2 (9 hp V-2)
Curtiss A-4
Curtiss A-8
 Curtiss B-4
Curtiss AB
Curtiss B-8
Curtiss C-1
Curtiss C-2
Curtiss C-4
Curtiss C-6
Curtiss C-12
Curtiss CD-12
Curtiss Crusader
Curtiss D-12
Curtiss E-4
Curtiss E-8 100 hp V-8
Curtiss H
Curtiss K
Curtiss H-1640 Chieftain
Curtiss K-6
Curtiss K-12
Curtiss S
Curtiss L
Curtiss O
Curtiss OX-2
Curtiss OX-5
Curtiss OXX-2
Curtiss OXX-3
Curtiss OXX-5
Curtiss OXX-6
Curtiss R-600 Challenger
Curtiss R-1454
Curtiss V V-8
Curtiss V-2 V-8
Curtiss V-3 V-8-8
Curtiss V-4 V-12
Curtiss V-1400
Curtiss V-1460
Curtiss V-1550
Curtiss V-1570 Conqueror
Curtiss VX

Curtiss-Kirkham
Curtiss-Kirkham K-12

Curtiss-Wright

Curtiss-Wright LR25
Curtiss-Wright RJ41 Ramjet
Curtiss-Wright RJ47 Ramjet
Curtiss-Wright RJ51 Ramjet
Curtiss-Wright RJ55 Ramjet
Curtiss-Wright RC2-60 Wankel engine
Curtiss-Wright R-600 Challenger
Curtiss-Wright TJ-32 (Olympus from Bristol, modified by CW)
Curtiss-Wright TJ-38 Zephyr (Americanised Olympus 551)

Cuyuna
See:2si

D

D-Motor

D-Motor LF26
D-Motor LF39

D'Hennian
 D'Hennian 10-12hp rotary
 D'Hennian 50hp 7-cyl rotary

Daiichi Kosho Company

Daiichi Kosho DK 472

Daimler-Benz

Source:Gunston except where noted

Daimler P 12hp 1896 airship engine
Daimler N 28hp 1899 airship engine
Daimler 1900 flugmotor
Daimler 1910 4-cyl. 55hp
Daimler H4L 160hp airship engine
Daimler J4 210hp airship engine
Daimler J4L 230hp airship engine
Daimler J4F 360hp airship engine
Daimler J8L 480hp airship engine
Daimler-Benz 1926 2-cyl.
Daimler-Benz F.2
Daimler-Benz 750hp V-12 diesel
Mercedes-Benz LOF.6 airship diesel engine
Daimler NL.1 – Zeppelin motor
Daimler-Benz OF 2 4-stroke V-12 diesel
Daimler-Benz DB 600
Daimler-Benz DB 601
Daimler-Benz DB 602 V-16 diesel
Daimler-Benz DB 603
Daimler-Benz DB 604 (X-24)
Daimler-Benz DB 605
Daimler-Benz DB 606 (Coupled DB 601)
Daimler-Benz DB 607 (Diesel)
Daimler-Benz DB 609 (IV-16)
Daimler-Benz DB 610 (Coupled DB 605)
Daimler-Benz DB 612
Daimler-Benz DB 613 (Coupled DB 603G)
Daimler-Benz DB 614
Daimler-Benz DB 615 (Coupled DB 614)
Daimler-Benz DB 616
Daimler-Benz DB 617
Daimler-Benz DB 618 (Coupled DB 617)
Daimler-Benz DB 619 (Coupled DB 609)
Daimler-Benz DB 620 (Coupled DB 628)
Daimler-Benz DB 621
Daimler-Benz DB 622
Daimler-Benz DB 623
Daimler-Benz DB 624
Daimler-Benz DB 625
Daimler-Benz DB 626
Daimler-Benz DB 627
Daimler-Benz DB 628
Daimler-Benz DB 629
Daimler-Benz DB 630 W-36(Coupled W-18)
Daimler-Benz DB 631
Daimler-Benz DB 632
Daimler-Benz DB 670
Daimler-Benz DB 720 (PTL 6)
Daimler-Benz DB 721 (PTL 10)
Daimler-Benz DB 730 (ZTL 6)
Daimler-Benz 109-007 (Turbofan)
Daimler-Benz 109-016 (Turbojet)
Daimler-Benz 109-021 (Turbojet)
Daimler-Benz PTL 6
Daimler-Benz PTL 10
Daimler-Benz ZTL 6
Daimler-Benz ZTL 6000
Daimler-Benz ZTL 6001
Daimler-Benz ZTL 109-007
Daimler F7502
Daimler-Versuchmotor F7506
Daimler D.IIIb – (not related to Mercedes D.III)

Mercedes 50hp 4-cyl in-line
Mercedes 60hp 4-cyl in-line 
Mercedes 70hp 4-cyl in-line inverted 
Mercedes 80hp 6-cyl in-line 
Mercedes 90hp 4-cyl in-line 
Mercedes 120hp 4-cyl in-line (airship engine) 
Mercedes 160hp 6-cyl in-line 
Mercedes 180hp 6-cyl in-line 
Mercedes 240hp 8-cyl in-line 
Mercedes 240hp V-8 (airship engine) 
Mercedes 260hp 6-cyl in-line 
Mercedes 650hp V-12 
Mercedes Typ E4F 70 hp 
Mercedes Typ E6F 100 hp 
Mercedes Typ J4L 120 hp 
Mercedes Typ J8L 240 hp V-8 
Mercedes W-18
Mercedes Fh 1256
Mercedes D.I
Mercedes D.II
Mercedes D.III
Mercedes D.IIIa
Mercedes D.IIIaü
Mercedes D.IIIav
Mercedes D.IV
Mercedes D.IVa

Damblanc-Mutti
 Damblanc-Mutti 165hp
 Damblanc-Mutti 11-cyl. rotary 220 hp

Danek
(Ceskomorarsk-Kolben-Danek & Co.)
 Danek Praga 500 hp V-12

Daniel
(Daniel Engine Company)
 Daniel 7-cyl rotary

Dansette-Gillet
 Dansette-Gillet Type A 45hp 4-cyl in-line 
 Dansette-Gillet Type C 32hp 4-cyl in-line 
 Dansette-Gillet Type D 70hp 4-cyl in-line 
 Dansette-Gillet 100hp 6-cyl in-line 
 Dansette-Gillet 120hp V-8 
 Dansette-Gillet 200hp 6-cyl in-line

Darracq

Data from:
Darracq 25hp O-2 
Darracq 50hp O-4 
Darracq 43hp 4-cyl in-line 
Darracq 84hp 4-cyl in-line 
Darracq 12Da 420 hp V-12

Dassault

 Dassault MD.30 Viper
 Dassault R.7 Farandole

Day
(Charles Day)
 Day 25hp 5-cyl

Dayton
(Dayton Airplane Engine Co.)
 Dayton Bear

de Dietrich
 de Dietrich 4-cyl in-line

De Dion-Bouton

 De Dion-Bouton 80 hp V-8 
 De Dion-Bouton 100 hp V-8 
 De Dion-Bouton 130 hp 12B V-12
 De Dion-Bouton 150 hp V-8 
 De Dion-Bouton 800 hp X-16

de Havilland

Sources: Piston engines, Lumsden, gas turbine and rocket engines, Gunston.

Piston engines
de Havilland Iris
de Havilland Ghost (V8)
de Havilland Gipsy
de Havilland Gipsy Twelve – known as "Gipsy King" in military service
de Havilland Gipsy Major – also known as Gipsy IIIA
de Havilland Gipsy Minor
de Havilland Gipsy Queen
de Havilland Gipsy Six

Gas turbines
Halford H.1
de Havilland Ghost
de Havilland Gnome
de Havilland Goblin
de Havilland Gyron
de Havilland Gyron Junior

Rockets
de Havilland Spectre
de Havilland Double Spectre – two Spectre engines mounted together
de Havilland Sprite – for rocket-assisted take off
de Havilland Super Sprite – development of Sprite

de Laval
de Laval T42

Deicke
(Arthur Deicke)
Deicke ADM-7

Delafontaine
Delafontaine Diesel – seven-cylinder air-cooled

Delage

 Delage 12C.E.D.irs
 Delage Gvis

DeltaHawk

DeltaHawk DH160
DeltaHawk DH180A4

Demont
(Messrs Demont, Puteaux, France)
 Demont 300hp 6-cyl double acting rotary

Deschamps
Data from:
(D.J.Deschampsdesigner – Lambert Engine & machine Co.,Illinois manufacturer)
Deschamps v-12 inverted 2-stroke diesel

Detroit Aero
 Detroit Aero 25-30hp 2OA

DGEN
(Price_Induction, Anglet, France)
 DGEN 380
 DGEN 390

Diamond Engines
 Diamond Engines GIAE 50R
 Diamond Engines GIAE 75R
 Diamond Engines GIAE-110R

Diemech Turbine Solutions
(DeLand, Florida, United States)
Diemech TJ 100
Diemech TP 100

Diesel Air
Diesel Air Dair 100

DKW

(A.G.-Werk DKW, Zschopau S.a.)
 DKW FL 600W

Doble-Besler
Doble-Besler V-2 steam engine

Dobrotvorskiy
 Dobrotvorskiy MB-100
 Dobrotvorskiy MB-102

Dobrynin
Source:Gunston
Dobrynin VD-4K
Dobrynin VD-7

Dongan

(also known as Harbin Engine Factory)
Dongan HS-7
Dongan HS-8
Dongan WJ-5
Dongan WZ-5
Dongan WZ-6

Dodge
 Dodge 125hp 6-cyl rotary Victory

Dorman
(W. H. Dorman and Co., Ltd)
 Dorman 60-80hp V-8

Douglas
Mostly developed from Douglas motorcycle engines
Douglas 350cc
Douglas 500cc 
Douglas Dot
Douglas 736cc (some sources 737cc)
Douglas 750cc
Douglas Digit 22 hp at 3,000rpm
Douglas Dryad
Douglas/Aero Engines Sprite/
Aero Engines 1500cc

Douseler
 Douseler 40hp 4-cyl in-line

Dreher
(Dreher Engineering Company)
Dreher TJD-76 Baby Mamba

Duesenberg

Duesenberg Special A
Duesenberg Special A3
Duesenberg H 850 hp V-16 
Duesenberg 100hp 4-cyl. direct drive in-line 
Duesenberg 125hp 4-cyl. geared in-line 
Duesenberg 300hp V-12 
Duesenberg A-44 70 hp 4-cyl

Dufaux

 Dufaux 5-cyl tandem double-acting in-line engine

Dushkin

 Dushkin D-1-A-1100
 Dushkin RD-A-150
 Dushkin RD-A-300
 Dushkin S-155
 Dushkin RD-2M

Dutheil et Chalmers
Data from: (some sources erroneously as Duthiel-Chambers)
Dutheil et Chalmers 20hp O-2 
Dutheil et Chalmers 25hp O-2 
Dutheil et Chalmers 37.25hp O-2 
Dutheil et Chalmers 40hp O-4 
Dutheil et Chalmers 50hp O-4
Dutheil et Chalmers 60hp O-6 
Dutheil et Chalmers 72.5hp O-6 
Dutheil et Chalmers 76hp O-4
Dutheil et Chalmers 38hp OP-2
Dutheil et Chalmers 56.5hp O-3 
Dutheil et Chalmers 75hp O-4 
Dutheil et Chalmers 97hp O-4 
Dutheil et Chalmers 100hp O-4 
Dutheil et Chalmers 72.5hp O-6

Dux
Dux Hypocycle

Dyna-Cam
 Dyna-Cam

E

Easton
Data from:
Easton 50hp V-8
Easton 75hp V-8

ECi

 ECi O-320
 ECi Titan X320
 ECi Titan X340
 ECi Titan X370

Ecofly
(Ecofly GmbH, Böhl-Iggelheim, Germany)
Ecofly M160

Edelweiss
 Edelweiss 75hp 6-cyl fixed piston radial 
 Edelweiss 125hp 6-cyl fixed piston radial

Eggenfellner Aircraft

Eggenfellner E6

E.J.C.
 E.J.C. 60hp 6-cyl rotary 
 E.J.C. 10-cyl rotary

Elbridge
(Elbridge Engine Company)
 Elbridge A 2IW 6-10 hp 
 Elbridge C 3IW 18-30 hp 
 Elbridge 4-cyl 4IW 
 Elbridge Featherweight 3-cyl 3IW 30-40 hp 
 Elbridge Featherweight 4-cyl 4IW 40-60 hp 
 Elbridge Featherweight 6-cyl 6IW 60-90 hp 
 Elbridge Aero Special 4IW 50-60 hp

Electravia

Electravia GMPE 102
Electravia GMPE 104
Electravia GMPE 205

Electric Aircraft Corporation

Electric Aircraft Corporation Electra 1

Elektromechanische Werke
Elektromechanische Werke Taifun rakatenmotor
Elektromechanische Werke Wasserfall rakatenmotor

Elizalde

Source:Gunston
Elizalde A
Elizalde A6?
Elizalde Dragon
Elizalde D V
Elizalde D VII
Elizalde D IX B.
Elizalde D IX M.R.
Elizalde D IX C.R.
Elizalde Super Dragon
Elizalde S.D.M
Elizalde S.D.M.R.
Elizalde S.D.C
Elizalde S.D.C.R.
Elizalde Sirio
Elizalde Tigre IV
Elizalde Tigre VI
Elizalde Tigre VIII
Elizalde Tigre XII

Ellehammer

 Elllehammer 3-cyl radial
 Elllehammer 5-cyl radial
 Elllehammer rotary engine

Emerson

 Emerson 100hp 6-cyl

EMG
(EMG Engineering Company / Eugene M. Gluhareff)
Gluhareff G8-2-20
Gluhareff G8-2-80
Gluhareff G8-2-130
Gluhareff G8-2-250

Emrax

Emrax 2
Emrax 207
Emrax 228
Emrax 268

Endicott
 Endicott 60hp 3-cyl 2-stroke

Engine Alliance

Engine Alliance GP7000

Engineered Propulsion Systems
(Engineered Propulsion Systems)
 Engineered Propulsion Systems Graflight V-8

Engineering Division

 Engineering Division W-1 750 hp W-18 
 Engineering Division W-1A-18
 Engineering Division W-2779
 Engineering Division W-2 1000 hp W-18 
 Engineering Division 350hp 9-cyl radial

ENMA
(Empresea Nacional de motores de Aviacion S.A.)
 ENMA Alcion
 ENMA Beta
 ENMA Flecha
 ENMA Sirio
 ENMA Tigre
 ENMA A-1 Alcion
 ENMA F-IV Flecha
 ENMA Flecha F.1
 ENMA Sirio S2
 ENMA Sirio S3
 ENMA S-VII Sirio
 ENMA 4.(2L)-00-93
 ENMA 7.E-CR.15-275
 ENMA 7.E-C20-500
 ENMA 7.E-CR20-600
 ENMA 7.E-CR.15-275
 ENMA 9.E-C.29-775

E.N.V.

E.N.V. Type A 
E.N.V. Type C 
E.N.V. Type D 
E.N.V. Type F/FA
E.N.V. Type H 
E.N.V. Type T 
E.N.V. 40hp V-8 
E.N.V. 62hp V-8 
E.N.V. 75hp V-8 
E.N.V. 100hp V-8 
E.N.V. 1914 100hp V-8
E.N.V. 1909 25/30hp O-4 
E.N.V. 1910 30hp O-4

ERCO

 ERCO IL-116

Esselbé
Esselbé 65hp 7-cyl rotary

Etoile
Etoile 400hp

EuroJet

Eurojet EJ200

Europrop

Europrop TP400

F

F&S
F&S K 8 B

Fahlin
 Fahlin Plymouth conversion

Fairchild

For Ranger and Fairchild Ranger engines see: Ranger
Source:Gunston except where noted
Fairchild Caminez 4-cylinder
Fairchild Caminez 8 cylinder
Fairchild J44
Fairchild J63
Fairchild J83
Fairchild T46

Fairdiesel
Fairdiesel barrel engine

Fairey
None of Fairey Aviation Company's own engine designs made it to production.
Felix – imported Curtiss D-12 engines
P.12 Prince – V-12
P.16 Prince – H-16
P.24 Monarch also known as Prince 4

Falconer
(Ryan Falconer Racing Engines)
 Falconer L-6
 Falconer V-12

Farcot
Farcot 8-10hp V-2
Farcot Fan-6
Farcot 100-110hp V-8
Farcot 30 hp 8cyl radial
Farcot 65 hp 8cyl radial 
Farcot 100 hp 8cyl radial

Farina
(S.A. Stabilimenti Farina)
Farina Algol
Farina Aligoth
Farina T.58

Farman

Source:Liron
Note: Farman engine designations differ from other French manufacturers in using the attributes as the basis of the designation, thus; Farman 7E (7-cyl radial E – Etoile / Star / Radial) or Farman 12We (W-12 fifth type – the e is not a variant or sub-variant it is the type designator). As usual there are exceptions such as the 12Gvi, 12B, 12C and 18T.

Farman 7E
Farman 7Ea
Farman 7Ear Les Établissements lipton
Farman 7Ears
Farman 7Ec
Farman 7Ed
Farman 7Edrs
Farman 8V 200 hp
Farman 8Va
Farman 8VI
Farman 9E
Farman 9Ea
Farman 9Ears
Farman 9Eb
Farman 9Ebr
Farman 9Ecr
Farman 9Fbr
Farman 12B
Farman 12Bfs
Farman 12Brs
Farman 12C
Farman 12Crs
Farman 12Crvi
Farman 12D
Farman 12Drs
Farman 12G inverted V-12 350 hp
Farman 12Goi
Farman 12Gvi
Farman 12V
Farman 12Va
Farman 12W
Farman 12Wa 40° W-12 1919
Farman 12Wb
Farman 12Wc
Farman 12Wd
Farman 12We
Farman 12Wers
Farman 12Wh
Farman 12Wiars
Farman 12Wirs
Farman 12Wkrs
Farman 12Wkrsc
Farman 12WI
Farman 18T
Farman 18W 
Farman 18Wa , 
Farman 18Wd
Farman 18We , 
Farman 18Wi , 
Farman 18Wirs

Fasey
 Fasey 200hp V-12

Fatava
Source:
 Fatava 45hp 4IL 
 Fatava 90hp V-8 
 Fatava 180hp X-16

Faure and Crayssac
 Faure and Crayssac 80hp rotary
 Faure and Crayssac 350hp 6-cyl. 2st barrel engine

Fedden
Designed post war by Roy Fedden  formerly of Cosmos Engineering and Bristol. Roy Fedden Ltd went into liquidation in 1947
 Fedden Cotswold – design only
 Fedden 6A1D-325 (185 hp 6HO)
 Fedden G6A1D-325 (geared) 6AID-325?

Fiat

Data from:Italian Civil & Military Aircraft 1930–1945

Fiat twin Airship engine
Fiat V-12 400hp ca. 1919
Fiat SA8/75 (50 hp V-8 air-cooled)  1908
Fiat S.54
Fiat S.55 (V-8 water-cooled 1912)
Fiat S.56A
Fiat S.76A
Fiat A.10
Fiat A.12
Fiat A.14
Fiat A.15
Fiat A.16
Fiat A.18
Fiat A.20
Fiat A.22
Fiat A.24
Fiat A.25
Fiat A.30
Fiat A.33
Fiat A.33 R.C.35
Fiat A.38 R.C.15/45
Fiat A.50
Fiat A.52
Fiat A.53
Fiat A.54
Fiat A.55
Fiat A.58
Fiat A.58 C.
Fiat A.58 R.C.
Fiat A.59
Fiat A.60
Fiat A.70
Fiat A.70 S.
Fiat A.74
Fiat A.75 R.C.53
Fiat A.76
Fiat A.76 R.C.18S
Fiat A.76 R.C.40
Fiat A.78
Fiat A.80
Fiat A.82
Fiat A.83
Fiat A.83 R.C.24/52
Fiat AS.2 Schneider Trophy 1926
Fiat AS.3
Fiat AS.5 Schneider Trophy 1929
Fiat AS.6 Schneider Trophy 1931
Fiat AS.8
Fiat RA.1000 Monsone
Fiat RA.1050 Tifone
Fiat ANA Diesel – six in-line, water-cooled – 220 hp
Fiat AN.1 Diesel
Fiat AN.2 Diesel
Fiat 4001
Fiat 4002
Fiat 4004
Fiat 4023
Fiat 4024
Fiat 4032
Fiat 4301
Fiat 4700
Fiat D.16

Firewall Forward Aero Engines
Firewall Forward CAM 100
Firewall Forward CAM 125

FKFS

FKFS Gruppen-Flugmotor A
FKFS Gruppen-Flugmotor B?
FKFS Gruppen-Flugmotor C
FKFS Gruppen-Flugmotor D
FKFS Gruppen-Flugmotor 37.6 L 48-cyl

Flader
Source:Geen and Cross
Flader J55 Type 124 Lieutenant
Flader T33 Type 125? Brigadier

Fletcher
Fletcher 5hp
Fletcher 9hp
Fletcher Empress 50 hp rotary

FNM

 FNM R-760
 FNM R-975

Ford

Ford O-145
4 Cylinder X engine
8 Cylinder X engine
Ford PJ31 Pulsejet, see Republic-Ford JB-2
Ford V-1650 Liberty V-12

Fox
(Dean Manufacturing Company, Newport, Kentucky)
 Fox 45hp 3-cyl in-line 2-stroke 
 Fox 36hp 4-cyl in-line 2-stroke 
 Fox 60hp 4-cyl in-line 2-stroke 
 Fox 90hp 6-cyl in-line 2-stroke 
 Fox 200hp 8-cyl in-line 2-stroke 
 Fox De-luxe 50hp 4-cyl in-line 2-stroke

Franklin

Source:Gunston.

Franklin 2A4-45
Franklin 2A4-49
Franklin 2A-110
Franklin 2A-120
Franklin 2AL-112
Franklin 4A-225
Franklin 4A-235
Franklin 4A4-100
Franklin 4A4-75
Franklin 4A4-85
Franklin 4A4-95
Franklin 4AC-150
Franklin 4AC-171
Franklin 4AC-176
Franklin 4AC-199
Franklin 4AC
Franklin 4ACG-176
Franklin 4ACG-199
Franklin 4AL-225
Franklin 6A-335
Franklin 6A-350
Franklin 6A3
Franklin 6A4
Franklin 6A4-125
Franklin 6A4-130
Franklin 6A4-135
Franklin 6A4-140
Franklin 6A4-145
Franklin 6A4-150
Franklin 6A4-165
Franklin 6A4-200
Franklin 6A8-215
Franklin 6A8-225-B8
Franklin 6AC-264
Franklin 6AC-298
Franklin 6AC-403
Franklin 6ACG-264
Franklin 6ACG-298
Franklin 6ACGA-403
Franklin 6ACGSA-403
Franklin 6ACSA-403
Franklin 6ACT-298
Franklin 6ACTS-298
Franklin 6ACV-245
Franklin 6ACV-298
Franklin 6ACV-403 (O-405? most likely company designation)
Franklin 6AG-335
Franklin 6AG4-185
Franklin 6AG6-245
Franklin 6AGS-335
Franklin 6AGS6-245
Franklin 6AL-315
Franklin 6AL-335
Franklin 6AL-500
Franklin 6ALG-315
Franklin 6ALV-335
Franklin 6AS-335
Franklin 6AS-350
Franklin 6V-335-A
Franklin 6V-335-A1A
Franklin 6V-335-A1B
Franklin 6V-335-B
Franklin 6V-335
Franklin 6V-350
Franklin 6V4
Franklin 6V4-165
Franklin 6V4-178
Franklin 6V4-200
Franklin 6V4-335
Franklin 6V6-245-B16F
Franklin 6V6-245
Franklin 6V6-300-D16FT
Franklin 6V6-300
Franklin 6VS-335
Franklin 8AC-398
Franklin 8ACG-398
Franklin 8ACG-538
Franklin 8ACGSA-538
Franklin 8ACSA-538
Franklin 12AC-596
Franklin 12AC-806
Franklin 12ACG-596
Franklin 12ACG-806
Franklin 12ACGSA-806
Franklin O-150
Franklin O-170
Franklin O-175
Franklin O-180 (Franklin 4AC-176-F3)
Franklin O-200
Franklin O-300
Franklin O-335
Franklin O-405
Franklin O-425-13
Franklin O-425-2
Franklin O-425-9
Franklin O-425
Franklin O-540
Franklin O-595
Franklin O-805
Franklin XO-805-1
Franklin XO-805-3
Franklin XO-805-312
Franklin Sport 4

Fredrickson
(World's Motor Company, Bloomington, Illinois)
 Fredrickson Model 5a
 Fredrickson Model 10a

Frontier
(Frontier Iron Works, Buffalo, New York)
 Frontier 35hp 4-cyl in-line 
 Frontier 55hp V-8

Fuji

 Fuji JO-1 (Nippon JO-1)
 Fuji J3-1 (Nippon J3-1)

Fuscaldo
 Fuscaldo 90hp

Funk
(Akron Aircraft Company / Funk Aircraft Company)
 Funk Model E

G

Gaggenau
 Gaggenau 4-cyl in-line

Gajęcki
 Gajęcki XL-Gad

Galloway
(Galloway Engineering Company ltd.)
 Galloway Adriatic 6IL 
 Galloway Atlantic (master rod)

Garrett

Source:Gunston except where noted

Now under Honeywell management/design/production

AiResearch GTC 43-44
AiResearch GTC 85 Gas generator for McDonnell 120
AiResearch GTP 30
AiResearch GTP 70
AiResearch GTP 331
AiResearch GTPU 7C
AiResearch GTG series
AiResearch GTU series
AiResearch GTCP 36
AiResearch GTCP 85
AiResearch GTCP 95
AiResearch GTCP 105
AiResearch GTCP 165
AiResearch GTCP 660
AiResearch TPE-331
AiResearch TSE-331
AiResearch TSE-231
AiResearch ETJ-131
AiResearch ETJ-331
AiResearch TJE-341
AiResearch 600
AiResearch 700
Garrett ATF3
Garrett TFE1042
Garrett TFE1088
Garrett TFE76
Garrett TFE731
Garrett TSE331
Garrett TPE331
Garrett TPF351
Garrett T76
Garrett F104
Garrett F109
Garrett F124
Garrett F125
Garrett JFS 100-13A

Garuff
Garuff A – aircraft diesel engine

GE Honda Aero Engines

GE Honda HF120

Geiger Engineering

Geiger HDP 10
Geiger HDP 12
Geiger HDP 13.5
Geiger HDP 16
Geiger HDP 25
Geiger HDP 32
Geiger HDP 50

GEN Corporation

GEN 125

General Aircraft Limited

General Aircraft Monarch V-4
General Aircraft Monarch V-6

General Electric

General Electric 7E
General Electric CF6
General Electric CF34
General Electric CF700
General Electric CFE738
General Electric CJ610
General Electric CJ805
General Electric CJ810
General Electric CT7
General Electric CT58
General Electric CTF39
General Electric GE1
General Electric GE4
General Electric GE1/10
General Electric GE15
General Electric GE27
General Electric GE36 (UDF)
General Electric GE37 
General Electric GE38
General Electric GE90
General Electric GE9X
General Electric GEnx
General Electric H75
General Electric H80
General Electric H85
General Electric I-A
General Electric I-16
General Electric I-20
General Electric/Allison I-40
General Electric TG-100
General Electric TG-110
General Electric/Allison TG-180
General Electric TG-190
General Electric X39
General Electric X211
General Electric X24A
General Electric X84
General Electric X353-5
General Electric F101
General Electric F103
General Electric F108
General Electric F110
General Electric F118
General Electric F120
General Electric F127
General Electric F128
General Electric F136
General Electric F138
General Electric F400
General Electric F404
General Electric T407
General Electric F412
General Electric F414
General Electric F700
General Electric J31
General Electric J33
General Electric J35
General Electric J39
General Electric J47
General Electric J53
General Electric J73
General Electric J77
General Electric J79
General Electric J85
General Electric J87
General Electric J93
General Electric J97
General Electric J101 (GE15)
General Electric JT12A
General Electric T31
General Electric T41
General Electric T58
General Electric T64
General Electric T407
General Electric T408
General Electric T700 (GE12)
General Electric T708
General Electric TF31
General Electric TF34
General Electric TF35
General Electric TF37
General Electric TF39

General Electric/Rolls-Royce
General Electric/Rolls-Royce F136

General Motors Research

 General Motors Research X-250

General Ordnance
(General Ordnance Company, Derby, Conn.)
 General Ordnance 200hp V-8

Giannini
(Pulsejets)
Giannini PJ33 
Giannini PJ35 
Giannini PJ37 
Giannini PJ39

Glushenkov

Source:Gunston.
Glushenkov TVD-10
Glushenkov TVD-20
Glushenkov GTD-3

Gnome et Rhône
Gnome et Rhône except where noted
Im French engine designations —even— sub-series numbers (for example Gnome-Rhône 14N-68) rotated anti-clockwise (LH rotation) and were generally fitted on the starboard side, —odd numbers— (for example Gnome-Rhône 14N-69) rotated clockwise (RH rotation) and were fitted on the port side.

Gnome
Gnome 1906 25hp rotary – prototype Gnome rotary engine
Gnome 34hp 5-cyl rotary 
Gnome 123hp 14-cyl rotary 
Gnome 1907 50hp
Gnome 7 Gamma 70 hp 
Gnome 14 Gamma-Gamma
Gnome 9 Delta 100 hp 
Gnome 18 Delta-Delta 200 hp
Gnome 7 Lambda 80 hp 
Gnome 14 Lambda-Lambda 160 hp
Gnome 7 Sigma 60 hp 
Gnome 14 Sigma-Sigma 120 hp
Gnome 7 Omega 50 hp 
Gnome 14 Omega-Omega 100 hp
Gnome Monosoupape 7 Type A 80 hp 
Gnome Monosoupape 9 Type B-2 100 hp 
Gnome Monosoupape 11 Type C 190 hp 
Gnome Monosoupape 9 Type N 165/170 hp 
Gnome Monosoupape 18 Type Double-N 300 hp
Gnome 600hp 20-cyl radial

Gnome et Rhône
Gnome-Rhône 5B – licence built Bristol Titan
Gnome-Rhône 5K Titan – licence built Bristol Titan
Gnome-Rhône 7K Titan Major – 7-cylinder development of 5K
Gnome-Rhône 9A Jupiter – licence built Bristol Jupiter
Gnome-Rhône 9K Mistral
Gnome-Rhône 14K Mistral Major
Gnome-Rhône 14M Mars
Gnome-Rhône 14N
Gnome-Rhône 14P
Gnome-Rhône 14R
Gnome-Rhône 18L
Gnome-Rhône 18R
Gnome-Rhône 28T

Gobe
 Gobe 2-stroke engine

Gobrón-Brillié
(Gustave Gobrón and Eugène Brillié)
Gobrón-Brillié 54hp X-8  (fitted to 1910 Voisin de-Caters)
Gobrón-Brillié 102hp X-8

Goebel
(Georg Goebel of Darmstadt) / (ver Gandenbergesche Maschinen Fabrik)
Goebel 2-cyl. 20/25hp HOA
Goebel Type II 100/110 hp 7-cyl. rotary 
Goebel Type III 200/230 hp 9-cyl. rotary 
Goebel Type V 50/60 hp 7-cyl. rotary 
Goebel Type VI 30/40 hp 7-cyl. rotary 
Goebel 170hp 9-cyl rotary
Goebel 170hp 11-cyl rotary
Goebel 180hp 11-cyl rotary

Grade

 Grade 16hp V-4 2-stroke

Great Plains Aircraft Supply

Great Plains Type 1 Front Drive

Green

Green 32hp 4-cyl in-line 
Green 60hp 4-cyl in-line 
Green 82hp V-8 
Green C.4
Green D.4
Green E.6
Green 150hp 6-cyl in-line 
Green 260-275hp V-12 1914
Green 300hp V-12 
Green 450hp W-18  1914

Grégoire-Gyp
(Pierre Joseph Grégoire / Automobiles Grégoire)
Grégoire-Gyp 26hp 4-cyl in-line (3-cyl?)
Grégoire-Gyp 40hp 4-cyl inverted in-line
Grégoire-Gyp 51hp 4-cyl in-line 
Grégoire-Gyp 70hp

Grey Eagle
 Grey Eagle 40hp 4-cyl in-line – 
 Grey Eagle 60hp 6-cyl in-line – 
 Grey Eagle 50hp 4-cyl in-line –

Grizodubov
(S.V. Grizodubov)
Grizodubov 1910 40hp 4-cyl.

Grob

 Grob 2500
 Grob 2500E

Guiberson
(Guiberson Diesel Engine Company)
Source:Gunston except where noted
Guiberson A-918
Guiberson A-980 – 
Guiberson A-1020 – 
Guiberson T-1020 –  (tank engine?)
Guiberson T-1400 –  (tank engine)

Guizhou
(Guizhou Liming Aircraft Engine Company)

 Guizhou WP-13
 Guizhou WS-13 ("Taishan")

Gyro

Data from:
 Gyro 50hp 7-cyl rotary Old Gyro 
 Gyro Model J 5-cyl 50 hp Duplex
 Gyro Model K 7-cyl 50 hp Duplex
 Gyro Model L 9-cyl 50 hp Duplex

H

Haacke
(Haacke Flugmotoren)Source: RMV
 Haacke HFM 2 – 2cyl.  25/28 hp 
 Haacke HFM 2a – 2cyl.  35 hp 
 Haacke HFM 3 – 3cyl. fan 40 hp
 Haacke 55/60hp 5-cyl. radial
 Haacke 60/70hp radial
 Haacke 90hp 7-cyl. radial
 Haacke 120hp 10-cyl. radial

HAL
See:Hindustan Aeronautics Limited

Hall-Scott

Hall-Scott 60 hp 
Hall-Scott A-1
Hall-Scott A-2 
Hall-Scott A-3 
Hall-Scott A-4 
Hall-Scott A-5 
Hall-Scott A-5a 
Hall-Scott A-7 
Hall-Scott A-7a 
Hall-Scott A-8 
Hall-Scott L-4 
Hall-Scott L-6

Hallett
(Hallett Aero Motors Corp, Inglewood CA.)
 Hallett H-526 7-cyl radial 130 hp

Hamilton
 Hamilton DOHC V-8

Hamilton Sundstrand

Sundstrand T100

Hansa-Lloyd
(Hansa-LLoyd Werke AG)
 Hansa-LLoyd V-16

Hansen-Snow
(W.G. Hansen & L.L. Snow, Pasadena, CA)
 Hansen-Snow 35hp 4-cyl in-line

Hardy-Padmore
 Hardy-Padmore 100hp 5-cyl rqdial

Harkness
(Donald (Don) Harkness, built by Harkness & Hillier Ltd)
 Harkness Hornet

Harriman
(Harriman Motors Company, South Glastonbury, Conn.)
 Harriman 30hp 4-cyl in-line
 Harriman 60hp 4-cyl in-line 
 Harriman 100hp 4-cyl in-line

Harris-Gassner
 Harris-Gassner 50/60hp V-8

Harroun

 Harroun 24hp 2-cyl HOA

Hart
Hart 150hp 9-cyl rotary 
Hart 156hp 9-cyl radial (?)

Hartland
Hartland 125hp

H.C.G.
(Les Établissements lipton)
 H.C.G. 2-cyl HOA

Heath
(Heath Aircraft Corp)
Heath 4-B
Heath 4-C
Heath B-4
Heath B-12
Heath C-2
Heath C-3
Heath C-6

Heath
(Heath Aerial Vehicle Company, Chicago Illinois)
Heath 25/30hp 4-cyl in-line

Heath-Henderson
Heath-Henderson B-4

Heinkel-Hirth

Source:

Heinkel HeS 1
Heinkel HeS 2
Heinkel HeS 3
Heinkel HeS 6
Heinkel HeS 8 (Heinkel 109-001)
Heinkel HeS 9
Heinkel HeS 10
Heinkel HeS 011(Heinkel 109-011)
Heinkel HeS 21
Heinkel HeS 30 (Heinkel 109-006)
Heinkel HeS 35
Heinkel HeS 36
Heinkel HeS 40 – paper design only
Heinkel HeS 50d
Heinkel HeS 50z
Heinkel HeS 053
Heinkel HeS 60
Heinkel 109-021

Helium
From Flight
 Helium 45hp 3-cyl radial 
 Helium 60hp 3-cyl radial 
 Helium 75hp 5-cyl radial 
 Helium 100hp 5-cyl radial 
 Helium 45hp 3-cyl rotary 2-stroke 
 Helium 60hp 3-cyl rotary 2-stroke 
 Helium 100hp 5-cyl rotary 2-stroke 
 Helium 120hp 6-cyl rotary 2-stroke 
 Helium 200hp 10-cyl rotary 2-stroke 
 Helium 120hp 6-cyl rotary 2-stroke 
 Helium 200hp 10-cyl rotary 2-stroke

Hendee

 Hendee Indian 60/65hp V-8 
 Hendee Indian 50hp 7-cyl rotary 
 Hendee Indian 60hp 9-cyl rotary

Henderson

 Henderson 6hp 4-cyl in-line

Herman
Herman 45hp
Herman 70hp

Hermes Engine Company

Hermes Cirrus

Hess
(Aubrey W. Hess / Alliance Aircraft Corporation)
 Hess Warrior

Hewland

Hewland AE75

Hexatron Engineering

Hexadyne P60
Hexadyne O-49

Hiero
(Otto Hieronimus – designer – several manufacturers)

 Hiero 50/60hp 4-cyl in-line 
 Hiero 6 – generic title for all the Hiero 6-cyl. engines
 Hiero B
 Hiero C
 Hiero D
 Hiero E 
 Hiero L 
 Hiero N
 Hiero 85/95hp 4-cyl in-line 
 Hiero 145hp 
 Hiero 185hp 
 Hiero 180/190hp 4-cyl inline 
 Hiero 200hp 6-cyl inline 
 Hiero 230/240hp 6-cyl inline 
 Hiero 240/250hp 6-cyl inline HC 
 Hiero 200/220hp V-8
 Hiero 300/320hp 6-cyl inline 
 Hiero 270/280hp 6-cyl inline 
 Hiero 35/40hp 2-cyl HOA

Hill Helicopters
 Hill Helicopters GT50

Hiller
Hiller 1910
Hiller 30hp
Hiller 60hp
Hiller 90hp

Hiller Aircraft

Hiller 8RJ2B – ramjet for the Hiller YH-32 Hornet

Hilz
 Hilz 45/50hp 4-cyl in-line 
 Hilz 50/55hp 4-cyl in-line 
 Hilz 65hp 4-cyl in-line

Hindustan Aeronautics Limited

HAL HPE-2
HAL PTAE-7
HAL HJE-2500
HAL HTFE-25
HAL HTSE-1200
HAL HPE-90
HAL P.E.90H
HAL HJE-2500
GTRE GTX-35VS Kaveri 
PTAE-7
GTSU-110

Hiro

Hiro Type 14
Hiro Type 61
Hiro Type 90 
Hiro Type 91 
Hiro Type 94

Hirth
Hirth Motoren GmbH was merged with Heinkel to make "Heinkel-Hirth" in 1941.

Hirth HM 60
Hirth HM 150
Hirth HM 500
Hirth HM 501
Hirth HM 504
Hirth HM 506
Hirth HM 508
Hirth HM 512
Hirth HM 515
Hirth F-10
Hirth F-23
Hirth F-30
Hirth F-33
Hirth F-36
Hirth F-40
Hirth F-102 
Hirth F-263
Hirth O-280
Hirth O-280R
Hirth 2702/2703 
Hirth 2704/2706
Hirth 3002
Hirth 3202/3203
Hirth 3502/3503
Hirth 3701

Hispano-Suiza

Hispano-Suiza 4B? 75 hp 4 in-line
Hispano-Suiza 5Q
Hispano-Suiza 6M 250 hp
Hispano-Suiza 6Ma 220 hp
Hispano-Suiza 6Mb 220 hp
Hispano-Suiza 6Mbr 250 hp
Hispano-Suiza 6O
Hispano-Suiza 6P
Hispano-Suiza 6Pa
Hispano-Suiza 8A
Hispano-Suiza 8B
Hispano-Suiza 8F
Hispano-Suiza 9Q licensed Wright J-6 / R-975 Whirlwind
Hispano-Suiza 9T licensed Clerget 9C, diesel radial
Hispano-Suiza 9V licensed Wright R-1820 Cyclone
Hispano-Suiza 12B (1945)
Hispano-Suiza 12G (W-12)
Hispano-Suiza 12Ga (W-12)
Hispano-Suiza 12Gb (W-12)
Hispano-Suiza 12H
Hispano-Suiza 12Ha
Hispano-Suiza 12Hb
Hispano-Suiza 12Hbr
Hispano-Suiza 12J
Hispano-Suiza 12Ja 350 hp
Hispano-Suiza 12Jb
Hispano-Suiza 12K
Hispano-Suiza 12Kbrs
Hispano-Suiza 12L
Hispano-Suiza 12Lb
Hispano-Suiza 12Lbr
Hispano-Suiza 12Lbrx
Hispano-Suiza 12M
Hispano-Suiza 12N
Hispano-Suiza 12X
Hispano-Suiza 12Y
Hispano-Suiza 12Z
Hispano-Suiza 14AA radial
Hispano-Suiza 14AB radial
Hispano-Suiza 14H radial
Hispano-Suiza 14Ha
Hispano-Suiza 14Hbs
Hispano-Suiza 14Hbrs 600 hp radial
Hispano-Suiza 14U diesel radial
Hispano Suiza 18R
Hispano-Suiza 18S
Hispano-Suiza 24Y
Hispano-Suiza 24Z
Latécoère-(Hispano-Suiza) 36Y
Hispano-Suiza 48H
Hispano-Suiza 48Z
Hispano-Suiza Nene
Hispano-Suiza Tay
Hispano-Suiza Verdon
Hispano-Suiza R.300
Hispano-Suiza R.800
Hispano-Suiza R.804
Hispano-Suiza J-5 Whirlwind
Hispano-Suiza Type 31
Hispano-Suiza Type 34
Hispano-Suiza Type 35
Hispano-Suiza Type 36
Hispano-Suiza Type 38
Hispano-Suiza Type 39
Hispano-Suiza Type 40
Hispano-Suiza Type 41
Hispano-Suiza Type 42
Hispano-Suiza Type 42VS
Hispano-Suiza Type 43
Hispano-Suiza Type 44
Hispano-Suiza Type 45
Hispano-Suiza Type 50 Ga W-12 450 hp
Hispano-Suiza Type 51 Ha V-12 450 hp
Hispano-Suiza Type 52 Ja V-12 350 hp
Hispano-Suiza Type 57 Mb V-12 500 hp
Hispano-Suiza Type 61
Hispano-Suiza Type 72
Hispano-Suiza Type 73
Hispano-Suiza Type 76
Hispano-Suiza Type 77
Hispano-Suiza Type 79
Hispano-Suiza Type 80
Hispano-Suiza Type 82
Hispano-Suiza Type 89 12Z
Hispano-Suiza Type 90
Hispano-Suiza Type 93

Hitachi

Source:Gunston.
Hitachi Ha12 (Army Type 95 150hp Air Cooled Radial)
Hitachi Ha13 (Army Type 95 350hp Air Cooled Radial)
Hitachi Ha13a (Army Type 98 450hp Air Cooled Radial)
Hitachi Ha42
Hitachi Ha47
Hitachi Ha-51 (unified designation)
Hitachi GK2
Hitachi GK4
Hitachi GK2 Amakaze
Hitachi Kamikaze
Hitachi Hatsukaze
Hitachi Jimpu
Hitachi Tempu
Army Type 95 150hp Air Cooled Radial (Ha12 – Hatsudoki system)
Army Type 95 350hp Air Cooled Radial (Ha13 – Hatsudoki system)
Army Type 98 450hp Air Cooled Radial (Ha13a – Hatsudoki system)
Army Type 4 110hp Air Cooled Inline (Ha47 – Hatsudoki system / GK4 – Navy system)

HKS

HKS 700E
HKS 700T

Hodge

Hodge 320hp 18-cyl radial

Hofer
(Al Hofer)
Hofer 10-12hp 4cyl in-line

Holbrook
(Holbrook Aero Supply)
Holbrook 35hp
Holbrook 50hp

Honda

 Honda HFX-01
 Honda HFX20
 Honda HF118
 GE Honda HF120

Honeywell

Honeywell ALF502
Honeywell HTF7000
Honeywell LF507
Honeywell LTS101
Honeywell TPE-331
Honeywell TFE731
Honeywell FX5

Hopkins & de Kilduchevsky
Hopkins & de Kilduchevsky 30-40hp
Hopkins & de Kilduchevsky 60-80hp

Howard
 Howard 120hp 6-cyl in-line

Hudson
(John W Hudson)
Hudson 100hp 10-cyl radial

Hummel
(James Morris (Morry) Hummel of Bryan, Ohio)
 Hummel 28hp 1/2 VW
 Hummel 32hp 1/2 VW
 Hummel 45hp 1/2 VW
 Hummel 50hp VW
 Hummel 60hp VW
 Hummel 70hp VW
 Hummel 85hp VW

HuoSai
(HuoSai – Piston engine)
 HuoSai HS-5
 HuoSai HS-6
 HuoSai HS-7
 HuoSai HS-8

Hurricane
Hurricane C-450 (8-cyl 2-stroke radial)

I

IAE

 IAE V2500
 IAE V2500SF SuperFan

I.Ae.

I.Ae. 16 El Gaucho
I.Ae. 19R El Indio
IA IAO-1600-RX/1

IAME
(Ital-American Motor Engineering)
KFM 104
KFM 105
KFM 107
KFM 112M

IAR

 IAR K7-I 20
 IAR K9-I C40
 IAR K14
 IAR 4-G1
 IAR 6-G1
 IAR LD 450
 IAR DB605

ICP

 ICP M09

IHI

Ishikawajima Tsu-11
Ishikawajima TR-10
Ishikawajima TR-12
Ishikawajima Ne-20
Ishikawajima Ne-20-kai
Ishikawajima Ne-30 Turbojet Engine of 850 kg
Ishikawajima Ne-130 
Ishikawajima Ne-230
Ishikawajima Ne-330 Turbojet of 1,320 hp
Ishikawajima-Harima JR100
Ishikawajima-Harima JR200
Ishikawajima-Harima JR220
Ishikawajima-Harima XJ11
Ishikawajima-Harima F3
Ishikawajima-Harima F5
Ishikawajima-Harima F7
Ishikawajima-Harima XF9
Ishikawajima-Harima IGT60
Ishikawajima-Harima J3
Ishikawajima-Harima XF5
Ishikawajima-Harima T64-IHI-10
Ishikawajima-Harima T58-IHI-8B BLC
Ishikawajima-Harima J79-17
Ishikawajima-Harima CT58-IHI-110

IL
(Instytut Lotnictwa – Aviation Institute)
IL SO-1
IL SO-3
IL K-15

ILO
ILO F 12/400

Imaer
 Imaer 1000
 Imaer 2000

Imperial
(Imperial Airplane Society)
Imperial 35-70hp (various 6cyl rotary engines)
Imperial 100hp (12cyl rotary)

In-Tech
(In-Tech International Inc.)
 In-Tech Merlyn

Indian
See: Hendee

Innodyn
(Innodyn L.L.C.)
 Innodyn TAE165
 Innodyn TAE185
 Innodyn TAE205
 Innodyn TAE255
 Innodyn 165 TE
 Innodyn 185 TE
 Innodyn 205 TE
 Innodyn 255 TE

International
Data from:
International 21.5hp 4-cyl rotary 
International 66hp 6-cyl rotary

Ion
(Gabriel Ion)
 Ion airship steam engine

Irwin
(Irwin Aircraft Co)
Irwin 79 Meteormotor (a.k.a. X)

Isaacson
(Isaacson Engine (Motor Supply Co.) / R.J. Isaacson)
Isaacson 45hp 7-cyl. radial 
Isaacson 50hp  
Isaacson 60hp  
Isaacson 6-cyl. radial
Isaacson 50hp 7-cyl. radial  
Isaacson 65hp 7-cyl. radial  
Isaacson 100hp 14-cyl. radial  
Isaacson 100hp 9-cyl. rotary  
Isaacson 200hp 18-cyl. rotary

Ishikawajima
See: IHI

Isotov
Source:Gunston
Isotov GTD-350
Isotov TV-2-117
Isotov TV-3-117
Isotov TVD-850

Isotta Fraschini

Isotta Fraschini L.170
Isotta Fraschini L.180 I.R.C.C.15/40 
Isotta Fraschini L.180 I.R.C.C.45 
Isotta Fraschini Asso 80
Isotta Fraschini Asso 120 R.C.40
Isotta Fraschini Asso 200
Isotta Fraschini Asso 250 
Isotta Fraschini Asso 450 Caccia
Isotta Fraschini Asso 500
Isotta Fraschini Asso 750
Isotta Fraschini Asso IX
Isotta Fraschini Asso 1000 
Isotta Fraschini Asso Caccia 
Isotta Fraschini Asso XI
Isotta Fraschini A.120 R.C.40 
Isotta Fraschini L.121 R.C.40 
Isotta Fraschini Asso XII
Isotta Fraschini Asso XII R.
Isotta Fraschini Asso (racing)
Isotta Fraschini Beta
Isotta Fraschini Gamma
Isotta Fraschini Delta
Isotta Fraschini Zeta
Isotta Fraschini Sigma
Isotta Fraschini Astro 7
Isotta Fraschini Astro 14
Isotta Fraschini V.4
Isotta Fraschini V.5
Isotta Fraschini V.6
Isotta Fraschini V.7 
Isotta Fraschini V.8 
Isotta Fraschini V.9 
Isotta Fraschini 245hp
Isotta Fraschini K.14 – licence built Gnome-Rhône Mistral Major
Isotta Fraschini 80T

Ivchenko

Source:Gunston.

Ivchenko AI-4 
Ivchenko AI-7 
Ivchenko AI-8
Ivchenko AI-9 
Ivchenko AI-10 
Ivchenko AI-14
Ivchenko AI-20
Progress AI-22
Ivchenko AI-24 
Ivchenko AI-25
Ivchenko AI-26
Progress AI-222
Ivchenko-Progress AI-322
Ivchenko-Progress AI-450S
Progress D-18T
Progress D-27
Lotarev D-36
Lotarev D-136
Progress D-236
Progress D-436

IWL
See:Pirna

J

Jabiru

Jabiru 1600
Jabiru 2200
Jabiru 3300
Jabiru 5100

Jack & Heinz
 Jack & Heinz O-126

Jacobs

Source:Gunston except where noted
Jacobs 35 hp
Jacobs B-1
Jacobs L-3
Jacobs L-4
Jacobs L-5
Jacobs L-6
Jacobs LA-1
Jacobs LA-2
Jacobs O-200
Jacobs O-240A
Jacobs O-240L
Jacobs O-360A (air-cooled)
Jacobs O-360L (liquid-cooled)
Jacobs R-755
Jacobs R-830
Jacobs R-915

Jaenson
 Jaenson 300hp V-8

Jalbert-Loire
Jalbert-Loire 4-cyl. 160 hp
Jalbert-Loire 6-cyl. 235 hp
Jalbert-Loire 16-H – 16-cyl. 600 hp

Jameson
(Jameson Aero Engines Ltd.)
Jameson FF-1 – 1940s horizontally opposed, four cylinder (106hp)

Janowski
(Jaroslaw Janowski)
Janowski Saturn 500

J.A.P.

Data from:
J.A.P. 1909 9hp 2-cyl.
J.A.P. 1909 20hp 4-cyl.
J.A.P. 38hp V-8 (air-cooled) 
J.A.P. 45hp V-8 (water-cooled) 
J.A.P. 1910 40hp V-8
J.A.P. 8-cyl.
Aeronca-J.A.P. J-99

Japanese rockets and Pulse-jets
Type4 I-Go Model-20 (Rocket)
Tokuro-1 Type 2 (Rocket)

Javelin
Javelin Ford 230hp conversion

Jawa
 Jawa 1000
 Jawa M-150

Jendrassik

Jendrassik Cs-1

J.E.T
(James Engineering Turbines Ltd)
 J.E.T Cobra

JetBeetle
 JetBeetle Tarantula H90
 JetBeetle Locust H150R
 JetBeetle Mantis H250

Jetcat
 Jetcat P160
 Jetcat P200
 Jetcat P300
 Jetcat P400

Johnson
Johnson Aero 75hp V-6 
Johnson Aero 100hp V-8 
Johnson Aero 150hp V-12

JLT Motors
(Boos, Seine-Maritime, France)
JLT Motors Ecoyota 82
JLT Motors Ecoyota 100

JPX
JPX 4TX75
JPX D160
JPX PUL 212
JPX PUL 425
JPX D-320

Junkers

Source:Kay

Jumo 4 later Jumo 204
Jumo 5 later Jumo 205
Junkers L1 air-cooled in-line 6 4-stroke petrol
Junkers L2
Junkers L3
Junkers L4
Junkers L5
Junkers L55
Junkers L7
Junkers L8
Junkers L88
Junkers L10
Junkers Jumo 004 Turbojet
Junkers Jumo 204
Junkers Jumo 205
Junkers Jumo 206
Junkers Jumo 207
Junkers Jumo 208
Junkers Jumo 209
Junkers Jumo 210
Junkers Jumo 211
Junkers Jumo 213
Junkers Jumo 218
Junkers Jumo 222
Junkers Jumo 223
Junkers Jumo 224
Junkers Jumo 225
Junkers Jumo 109-004
Junkers Jumo 109-006 (Junkers/Heinkel 109-006)
Junkers Jumo 109-012
Junkers Jumo 109-022
Junkers Mo3 diesel opposed-piston aero-engine prototype
Junkers Fo2 Petrol opposed-piston 6-cyl/12piston horizontal
Junkers Fo3 diesel opposed-piston aero-engine prototype
Junkers Fo4 diesel opposed-piston aero-engine prototype
Junkers SL1 company designation for Fo4

K

Kalep
(Fyodor Grigoryevich Kalep)
Kalep 1911 4-cyl 2-stroke
Kalep-60
Kalep-80
Kalep-100

Kawasaki

Source:Gunston except where noted
Kawasaki Ha9 – licence-built BMW VI for IJAAF
Kawasaki Ha40 – licence-built Daimler-Benz DB 601A for IJAAF
Kawasaki Ha-60
Kawasaki Ha140
Kawasaki Ha201 – twin Ha40s with common gearbox
Kawasaki KAE-240
Kawasaki 440 engine.
Kawasaki KJ12
Kawasaki KT5311A

Kelly
 Kelly 200hp 2-stroke 4-cyl inline

Kemp

(a.k.a. Grey Eagle)
Kemp D-4
Kemp E-6
Kemp G-2
Kemp H-6 (55 hp 6IL) 
Kemp I-4 (35 hp 4IL) 
Kemp J-8 (80 hp V-8) 
Kemp K-2
Kemp M-2
Kemp O-101
Kemp-Henderson 27hp

Ken Royce
LeBlond Aircraft Engine Corporation was sold to Rearwin Airplanes in 1937 and renamed Ken-Royce.

Ken-Royce 5E – LeBlond 70-5E
Ken-Royce 5G – LeBlond 90-5G
Ken-Royce 7F- developed from LeBlond 7DF
Ken-Royce 7G

Kessler
Kessler 200hp 
Kessler 6C-400

KFM
(KFM (Komet Flight Motor) Aircraft Motors Division of Italian American Motor Engineering)
 KFM 107
 KFM 112M

Khatchaturov
 Khatchaturov R-35

KHD

Humboldt-Deutz 6 cyl. in-line diesel
Klöckner-Humboldt-Deutz diesel 8 cyl. rotary DZ 700?
Klöckner-Humboldt-Deutz DZ 700
Klöckner-Humboldt-Deutz DZ 710 16-cylinder horizontally opposed diesel
Klöckner-Humboldt-Deutz DZ 720 32-cylinder H-block version of the 710
KHD T112 (APU)
KHD T117
KHD T317
Klöckner-Humboldt-Deutz T53-L-13A

Kiekhaefer

Kiekhaefer O-45
Kiekhaefer V-105

Kimball
Kimball Beetle K
Kimball Gnat M

King

(Chas. B. King)
King 550hp V-12

King-Bugatti
King-Bugatti U-16

Kinner

Source:Gunston except where noted
Kinner 60 hp
Kinner B-5
Kinner B-54
Kinner C-5
Kinner C-7
Kinner SC-7
Kinner K-5
Kinner O-550
Kinner O-552
Kinner R-5
Kinner R-53
Kinner R-55
Kinner R-56
Kinner R-370
Kinner R-440
Kinner R-540
Kinner R-720
Kinner R-1045-2

Kirkham

Kirkham 50hp 4IL (C-4?) 
Kirkham 75-85hp
Kirkham 110hp
Kirkham 180hp 9-cyl. radial
Kirkham B-4 
Kirkham B-6 
Kirkham B-12
Kirkham BG-6 (geared) 
Kirkham C-4
Kirkham K-12

Kishi
 Kishi 70hp V-8

Klimov

Source:Gunston

Klimov M-100
Klimov M-103
Klimov M-105
Klimov VK-106
Klimov VK-107 
Klimov VK-108
Klimov VK-109
Klimov M-120
Klimov RD-33
Klimov RD-45
Klimov RD-500
Klimov VK-1
Klimov VK-2
Klimov VK-3
Klimov VK-5
Klimov VK-2500
Klimov VK-800
Klimov TV2-117
Klimov TV3-117
Klimov TV7-117

Knox
(Knox Motors Company, Springfield Mass.)
Knox 300hp V-12 
Knox H-106
Knox R-266

Koerting
 Koerting 65hp V-8 
 Koerting 185hp V-8 
 Koerting 250hp V-12

Kosoku
(Kosokudo Kikan KK)
 Kosoku KO-4

Kolesov
Kolesov RD-36-51
Kolesov VD-7

Köller
(Dr. Kröber und Sohn GmbH, Treuenbrietzen)
 Köller M3

König
(Compact Radial Engines)
König SC 430
König SD 570

Konrad
(Oberbayische Forschungsanhalt Dr. Konrad)
Konrad 109-613
Konrad Enzian IV rakatenmotor
Konrad Enzian V rakatenmotor
Konrad Rheintochter R 3 rakatenmotor

Körting
Körting Kg IV V-8
Körting 8 SL

Kossov
 Kossov MG-31F

Kostovich
(O.S. Kostovich)
Kostovich 2-cyl airship engine
Kostovich 80hp 8-cyl airship engine

Krautter
(Dipl. Ing. Willi Krautter)
Krautter-Leichtflugmotor

Kroeber
(Doktor Kroeber & Sohn G.m.b.H.)
Kroeber M4

Kruk
 Kruk rotary

Kuznetsov

Source:Gunston except where noted
Kuznetsov Type 022
Kuznetsov NK-2
Kuznetsov NK-4
Kuznetsov NK-6
Kuznetsov NK-8
Kuznetsov NK-12
Kuznetsov NK-22
Kuznetsov NK-25
Kuznetsov NK-32
Kuznetsov NK-86
Kuznetsov NK-87
Kuznetsov NK-88
Kuznetsov NK-89
Kuznetsov NK-144
Kuznetsov TV-2
Kuznetsov 2TV-2F

L

L'Aisle Volante
 L'Aisle Volante C.C.4

Labor
 Labor 70hp 4-cyl in-line

Lambert Engine Division
(Monocoupe Corporation – Lambert Engine Division)
Lambert M-5
Lambert R-266
Lambert R-270

Lamplough
 Lamplough 6-cyl 2-stroke rotary 
 Lamplough 6-cyl 2-stroke axial

Lancia
(Lancia & Company. / Vincenzo Lancia)
Lancia Tipo 4 
Lancia Tipo 5

Lange
Lange EA 42

Laviator
 Laviator 35hp 3-cyl rotary 2-stroke 
 Laviator 50hp 6-cyl rotary 2-stroke 
 Laviator 65hp 6-cyl rotary 2-stroke 
 Laviator 75hp 9-cyl rotary 2-stroke 
 Laviator 100hp 12-cyl rotary 2-stroke 
 Laviator 80hp 6-cyl 2-stroke water-cooled radial 
 Laviator 120hp 4IL 
 Laviator 110hp 6IL 
 Laviator 250hp 6IL 
 Laviator 80hp V-8 
 Laviator 120hp V-8 
 Laviator 200hp V-8

Lawrance

Lawrance A-3 
Lawrance B 60 hp 3-cyl.
Lawrance C-2
Lawrance J-1
Lawrance J-2
Lawrance L-2 65 hp 
Lawrance L-3
Lawrance L-4 a.k.a. 'Wright Gale'
Lawrance L-5
Lawrance L-64
Lawrance N
Lawrance N-2 40HP 2OA 
Lawrance R
Lawrance R-1
Lawrance-Moulton A (France)
Lawrance-Moulton B (200 hp V-8 USA) 
 Lawrance 140hp 9-cyl radial 
 Lawrance 200hp 9-cyl radial

Lawrence Radiation Laboratory

Tory IIA (Project Pluto)
Tory IIC (Project Pluto)

Le Gaucear
 Le Gaucear 150hp 10-cyl rotary

Le Maitre et Gerard
 Le Maitre et Gerard 700hp V-8

Le Rhône

Le Rhône 7A
Le Rhône 7B
Le Rhône 7B2
Le Rhône 7Z
Le Rhône 9C
Le Rhône 9J
Le Rhône 9R
Le Rhône 9Z
Le Rhône 11F
Le Rhône 14D
Le Rhône 18E (1912)
Le Rhône 18E (1917)
Le Rhône 28E
Le Rhône K
Le Rhône L
Le Rhône M
Le Rhône P
Le Rhône R

LeBlond

LeBlond was sold to Rearwin and engines continued under Ken-Royce name.
LeBlond B-4
LeBlond B-8
LeBlond 40-3
LeBlond 60-5D
LeBlond 70-5DE
LeBlond 75-5
LeBlond 80-5
LeBlond 85-5DF
LeBlond 70-5E
LeBlond 80-5F (in military use known as R-265)
LeBlond 85-5DF
LeBlond 90-5F
LeBlond 90-5G
LeBlond 90-7
LeBlond 110-7
LeBlond 120-7
LeBlond 7D
LeBlond 7DF

Lee
Lee 80hp

Lefèrve
(F. Lefèrve)
 Lefèrve 2-cyl. 33hp

Lenape
Lenape AR-3
Lenape LM-3 Papoose 3-cyl.
Lenape LM-5 Brave 5-cyl.
Lenape LM-7 Chief 7-cyl.
Lenape LM-125 Brave (suspect should be LM-5-125)
Lenape LM-365 Papoose (suspect should be LM-3-65)
Lenape LM-375 Papoose (suspect should be LM-3-75)

Lessner
Lessner 1908 4-cyl airship engine

Levavasseur
Léon Levavasseur see Antoinette

Levi
 Levi 7-cyl barrel engine

Leyland Motors
J. G. Parry-Thomas, the chief engineer at Leyland Motors.
 A single X-8 engine was built in August 1918 but failed during testing and with the end of WWI development was abandoned.

LFW
 LFW 0
 LFW I
 LFW II
 LFW III
 LFW-12 X-1

LHTEC

LHTEC T800

Liberty
Source:Gunston except where noted
Liberty L-4
Liberty L-6
Liberty L-8
Liberty L-12
Liberty L-12 double-crankshaft
Liberty X-24

Ligez
 Ligez 3-cyl rotary

Light
Light Kitten 20
Light Kitten 30
Light Tiger 100
Light Tiger 125
Light Tiger Junior 50

Lilloise
See:C.L.M.

Limbach

Limbach L1700
Limbach L2000
Limbach L2400
Limbach L275E
Limbach L550E

Lincoln
Rocket 29hp

Lindequist
(Konsortiert Överingeniör Sven Lindequist's Uppfinninggar – Consortium Senior Engineer Sven Lindqvist Inventions)
 Lindewqiuist 1,000hp Stratospheric engine

Les Long Long Harlequin
Long Harlequin 933

Lockheed

Lockheed XJ37/L-1000

LOM
(Letecke Opravny Malesice, Praha)
 LOM M132
 LOM M137
 LOM M337

Loravia
(Yutz, France)
Loravia LOR 75

Lorraine-Dietrich

(Société Lorraine des Anciens Établissements de Dietrich)
Source:Jane's All the World's Aircraft 1938
except where noted

Lorraine 3B licence-built Potez 3B?
Lorraine 3D licence-built Potez 3B
Lorraine 5P Ecole – 5 cyl radial
Lorraine 6A – (AM) 110 hp
Lorraine 6Ba – 6 cyl two-row radial 130CV
Lorraine 7M Mizar – 7 cyl radial
Lorraine 8A – V-8
Lorraine 8Aa
Lorraine 8Ab
Lorraine 8Aby
Lorraine 8B – V-8
Lorraine 8Ba
Lorraine 8Bb
Lorraine 8Bd
Lorraine 8Be
Lorraine 8BI (inverted?)
Lorraine 9A
Lorraine 9N Algol – Type 120 9 cyl radial
Lorraine Dietrich 12Cc ? Dc in error?
Lorraine 12? Hibis 450 hp
Lorraine 12D
Lorraine 12 DOO 460 hp O-12
Lorraine 12E Courlis – W-12 450 hp
Lorraine 12F Courlis – W-12 600 hp
Lorraine 12H Pétrel – V-12
Lorraine 12Q Eider
Lorraine 12Qo Eider
Lorraine 12R Sterna – V-12 Type 111 700 hp
Lorraine 12Rs Sterna – V-12 Type 111 700 hp
Lorraine 12Rcr Radium – inverted V-12 with turbochargers 2,000 hp
Lorraine 14A Antarès – 14 cylinder radial 500 hp
Lorraine 14E – 14 cylinder radial 470 hp
Lorraine 18F Sirius – Type 112
Lorraine 18F.0 Sirius
Lorraine 18F.00 Sirius
Lorraine 18F.100 Sirius
Lorraine 18G Orion – W-18
Lorraine 18Ga Orion – W-18
Lorraine 18Gad Orion – W-18
Lorraine 18K – W-18
Lorraine 18Ka
Lorraine 18Kd
Lorraine 18Kdrs
Lorraine 24 – W-24 1,000 hp (3 banks of 8 cylinders)
Lorraine 24E Taurus – 24 cyl in-line radial (six banks of 4-inline?) 1,600 hp
Lorraine P5
Lorraine AM (moteur d’Aviation Militaire (A.M.)) – derived from German 6-cyl in-line engines
Lorraine Algol Junior – 230 hp
Lorraine-Latécoère 8B
Lorraine Diesel – built in 1932, rated at 200 hp
Lorraine DM-400

Lotarev
(Vladimir Lotarev) (see also Ivchenko-Progress)
Lotarev D-36
Lotarev D-136
Lotarev D-236-T
Lotarev DV-2
Lotarev RD-36 (lift turbofan)

Loughead
Loughead XL-1

LPC

 LPC Fang 1-KS-40
 LPC Sword 3.81-KS-4090
 LPC Meteor 33-KS-2800
 LPC Mercury 0.765-KS-53,600
 LPC Viper I-C 5.6-KS-5,400
 LPC Viper II-C 3.77-KS-8,040
 LPC Lance I-C 6.65-KS-38,800

LSA-Engines
(LSA-Engines GmbH, Berlin, Germany)
LSA-Engines LSA850

Lucas

Lucas CT 3201

Lutetia
(Marcel Echard / Moteurs Lutetia)
 Lutetia 4.C.02 V-4, 2-stroke, 1267 cc, 40-45 hp at 2800rpm
 Lutetia 6-cyl radial 70 hp a 2600 rpm

Lycoming

Lycoming O-145
Lycoming O-160
Lycoming O-233
Lycoming IO-233
Lycoming O-235
Lycoming O-290
Lycoming O-320
Lycoming O-340
Lycoming O-350
Lycoming O-360
Lycoming IO-390
Lycoming O-435
Lycoming O-480
Lycoming O-530
Lycoming O-540
Lycoming O-541
Lycoming IO-580
Lycoming GSO-580
Lycoming SO-590
Lycoming IO-720
Lycoming O-1230
Lycoming R-500
Lycoming R-530
Lycoming R-645
Lycoming R-680
Lycoming H-2470
Lycoming XR-7755 (36cyl 7,755ci)
Lycoming AGT1500
Lycoming AL55
Lycoming ALF101
Lycoming ALF502
Lycoming LF507
Lycoming LTC1
Lycoming LTC4
Lycoming LTP101
Lycoming LTS101
Lycoming PLF1A
Lycoming PLF1B
Lycoming F102 (ALF502)
Lycoming F106 (ALF502)
Lycoming F408 (Teledyne CAE 382)
Lycoming J402 (Teledyne CAE 370/372/373)
Lycoming T702 (PLT27)
Lycoming T53
Lycoming T55
Lycoming TF40

Lyulka

Source:Gunston.
Lyulka TR-1
Lyulka AL-5
Lyulka AL-7
Lyulka AL-21
Lyulka AL-31
Lyulka AL-34
Lyulka TS-31M

LZ Design
Front electric sustainer

M

M&D Flugzeugbau

 M&D Flugzeugbau TJ-42

MAB
 4-cylinder air-cooled "fan" engine
 4-cylinder vertical water-cooled in-line engine

MacClatchie
MacClatchie X-2 Panther

Macchi

 Macchi MB.2 – 2.cyl 20 hp at 3,000 rpm

Macomber Avis
Macomber Rotary Engine Company with Avis Engine Company
 Macomber Avis 7-cylinder axial engine

M.A.N.
Maschinenfabrik Augsburg-Nürnberg (MAN)
 Licence-built Argus As III
 MAN Mana V (350 hp V-10) V-10 airship engine?
 MAN Mana III (185 hp 6-cyl in-line)
 260 hp 6-cylinder in-line – "quite similar to 160-hp Mercedes design"

MAN Turbo

MAN Turbo 6012
MAN Turbo 6022
Rolls-Royce/MAN Turbo RB153
Rolls-Royce/MAN Turbo RB193

Manfred Weiss
See: Weiss

Manly
Charles M. Manly redesigned an engine built by Stephen Balzer.
Manly–Balzer engine

Mantovani
Mantovani Citroën 2CV car engine conversion

Marchetti
(Marchetti Motor Patents)
Marchetti A

Mark
(Stahlwerk Mark Flugzeugbau)
 Mark F.II (35 hp)
 Mark M.3 (40 hp)
 Mark M.5 (70 hp)
 Mark 55hp
 Mark 120hp

Marcmotor
(Macerata, Italy)
Marcmotor ROS100
Marcmotor ROS125
Marcmotor ROS200

Marlin-Rockwell
Marlin-Rockwell 72hp

Marquardt Corporation

Marquardt PJ40 pulsejet
Marquardt PJ46 pulsejet
Marquardt RJ30 C-20 ramjet
Marquardt RJ31 C-30 Ramjet
Marquardt RJ34 ramjet
Marquardt RJ39 ramjet
Marquardt RJ43
Marquardt RJ57ramjet
Marquardt RJ59ramjet
Marquardt MA-19
Marquardt MA-20
Marquardt MA-24
Marquardt MA-74
Marquardt MA-196
Marquardt C-20 (2x C-20s fitted to P-51 and 2x Marquardt C20-85D fitted to P-80A 44-85042)
Marquardt C-30 (2x Marquardt C30-10B fitted to P-80A 44-85214)
Marquardt C-48
Marquardt R-1E
Marquardt R-40A

Martin

Martin 133? typo?
Martin 333
Martin 500
Martin 8200 (190 hp V-8) 
Martin L-330

Maru
Maru Ka10

Masson
 Masson 50hp 6-cyl in-line

Mathis

 Mathis G.2F
 Mathis G.4
 Mathis G.4F
 Mathis G.4R
 Mathis G.7
 Mathis G.7R
 Mathis G.8
 Mathis G.8R
 Mathis G.14R
 Mathis G.14RS
 Mathis G.16R
 Mathis Vega 42
 Mathis Vesta 42
 Mathis 175H
 Mathis 2.G.60
 Mathis 4.G.60
 Mathis 4.GB.60
 Mathis 4.GB.62
 Mathis BG-20
 Mathis 12.GS.DS
 Mathis 16.GB.21

Mawen
(Mawen S.A.)
 Mawen 150hp rotary
 Mawen 350hp rotary
 Mawen 700hp two row rotary

Max Ams
(Max Ams machine Company)
 Max Ams 75hp V-8

Maxim

Maxim 87hp 4-cyl in-line

Maximotor Makers
Maximotor 50hp
Maximotor 60-70hp
Maximotor 70-80hp
Maximotor 80-100hp
Maximotor 100hp
Maximotor 120hp
Maximotor 150hp
Maximotor A-4 (50 hp 4ILW) 
Maximotor A-6 (75 hp 6ILW) 
Maximotor A-8 (110 hp V-8)
Maximotor B-6 (115 6ILW) 
Maximotor 70hp 4-in-line

Maybach

Maybach AZ 
Maybach DW 
Maybach IR  
Maybach BY  
Maybach CX  
Maybach HS  
Maybach HS D
Maybach HS-Lu
Maybach Mb.III
Maybach Mb.IV
Maybach Mb.IVa
Maybach 300hp  
Maybach VL.I
Maybach VL.II
Maybach 180hp 6IL
Maybach 200hp 6IL  
Maybach 300hp 6IL

Mayo
{Mayo Radiator Co)
Mayo 1915 (6LW)

McCulloch

McCulloch MAC-101
McCulloch 104-100
McCulloch O-90
McCulloch O-100
McCulloch O-150
McCulloch 4318A O-100-1
McCulloch 4318B O-100-2
McCulloch 4318C O
McCulloch 4318E YO-100-4
McCulloch TSIR-5190
McCulloch 6150 O-150-1
McCulloch 6318 O-150-2

McDonnell

McDonnell PJ42 pulsejet

McDowell
(Geo. McDowell. Brooklyn NY.)
McDowell Twin-Piston V-4 2-stroke

Mead
(Mead Engine Co.)
Mead 50hp 4-cyl in-line

Mekker
Mekker Sport

Menasco

Sources:Gunston and Jane's.
Menasco Pirate/Super Pirate
Menasco Buccaneer/Super Buccaneer
Menasco M-50
Menasco Unitwin 2-544
Menasco-Salmson B-2
Menasco L-365 – Military designation for Pirate
Menasco XIV-2040  
Menasco XH-4070 
Menasco RJ37

Mengin
(Établissements Pierre Mengin)
 Mengin B
 Mengin C (later 2A.01), Poinsard design
 Mengin G.M.H. (Genete, Mengin, and Hochet)
 Mengin 2A.01 Poinsard design
 Hochet-Mengin

Mercedes
See: Daimler-Benz

Merkulov
(Ivan A. Merkulov)
 Merkulov DM-4 ramjet

Métallurgique

Data from:
Métallurgique 32hp 4-cyl in-line 
Métallurgique 40hp 4-cyl in-line 
Métallurgique 48hp 4-cyl in-line 
Métallurgique 60hp 4-cyl in-line 
Métallurgique 90hp 4-cyl in-line

Meteormotor
Meteormotor 20-25hp

Meteor
(Meteor S.p.A. Constuzioni Aeronautiche)
Meteor G 80cc
Meteor Alfa 1
Meteor Alfa 1AQ
Meteor Alfa 2
Meteor Alfa 2AQ
Meteor Alfa 2V
Meteor Alfa 3
Meteor Alfa 3AQ
Meteor Alfa 4
Meteor Alfa 4V
Meteor Alfa 5

Metropolitan-Vickers

Metrovick F.1
Metrovick F.2 Freda
Metrovick F.2/2
Metrovick F.2/3
Metrovick F.2/4 Beryl
Metrovick F.3
Metrovick F.5
Metrovick F.9 Sapphire

Metz
(Metz Company, Waltham, Mass.)
Metz 125hp rotary

Michel
 Michel IV-AT3
 Michel 4A-14
 Michel RAT-3  100 hp
 Michel A.M. 14 MARK II
 Michel A.M.7 6L 200 hp
 Michel A.M.14 Type I 4L 100 hp
 Michel A.M.14 Type II
 Michel A.M.14 Type III
 Michel A.M.16 6L 40 hp

Michigan
Michigan 2-cyl 2-stroke rotary 
Michigan Rover

Microturbo

Microturbo TRB 13
Microturbo SG 18
Microturbo TRS 18
Microturbo TRB 19
Microturbo TRS 25
Microturbo TRI-40
Microturbo TRI 60
Microturbo TFA 66
Microturbo TRI 80
Microturbo TFA 130
Microturbo J403
Microturbo Cougar
Microturbo Eclair
Microturbo Eclair II
Microturbo Lynx
Microturbo Noelle
Microturbo Emeraude
Microturbo Espadon
Microturbo Saphir 007

Mid-west
(Mid-West Engines Limited / Diamond engines / Austro Engine)
 MidWest AE50
 MidWest AE100
 MidWest AE110
 Austro Engine AE50R
 Austro Engine AE75R

Miese
Data from:
Miese 50-60hp 8-cyl
Miese 100hp 8-cyl radial

Mikulin

Mikulin AM-3M
Mikulin AM-13
Mikulin AM-34
Mikulin AM-35
Mikulin AM-37
Mikulin AM-38
Mikulin AM-39
Mikulin AM-42
Mikulin M-85
Mikulin RD-3M
Mikulin M-17
Mikulin M-209
Mikulin AM-TKRD-01

Mikulin-Stechkin
(A.A. Mikulin & B.S. Stechkin)
AMBS-1

Milwaukee Tank
Milwaukee Tank V-470
Milwaukee Tank V-502

Miller
 Miller 22hp radial

Miller
(Harry A. Miller Manufacturing Company)
 Miller 125hp 4-cyl in-line 
 Miller V-12

Minié
Data from: 
(Établissements Minié, Colombes, Seine, France)
 Minié 4.B0 Horus
 Minié 4.D
 Minié 4.E0 Horus
 Minié 4.E2 Horus

Mistral Engines

Mistral G-190
Mistral G-200
Mistral G-230-TS
Mistral G-300
Mistral G-360-TS
Mistral K-200
Mistral K-300

Mitsubishi

Mitsubishi Ha-42
Mitsubishi Ha-43
Mitsubishi Kasei
Mitsubishi Kinsei
Mitsubishi Shinten
Mitsubishi TS1/MG5
Mitsubishi Zuisei

Modena Avio Engines
(Rubiera, Italy)
MAE 323

Monaco
(Monaco Motor and Engineering Co. Ltd.)
 Monaco 75hp
 Monaco 100hp

Monnett

Data from:'''
 Monnett AeroVee
 Monnett 1600cc E-Vee
 Monnett 1600cc SuperVee
 Monnett 1700cc E-Vee
 Monnett 1700cc SuperVee
 Monnett 1835cc E-Vee
 Monnett 2007cc E-Vee

Morehouse
Morehouse 15hp
Morehouse 29hp
Morehouse M-42
Morehouse M-80

MorsData from:Mors 30hp V-4 

Mosler
(Mosler, Inc. of Hendersonville, North Carolina)
 Mosler MM CB-35
 Mosler MM CB-40
 Mosler Red 82X

Motor Sich

Motor Sich MS-500V

Motorav Industria

 Motorav 2.3 V
 Motorav 2.6 R
 Motorav 2.6 V
 Motorav 2.8 R
 Motorav 3.1 R

Motorlet

Motorlet M-701
Motorlet M-601
Motorlet M-602
Motorlet M-20
Motorlet AI-25/Titan/Sirius – see Ivchenko AI-25

Mozhaiskiy
Mozhaisky gas fired machine

MTH

MTH R 422-CG

MTR

MTR MTR390

MTU Aero Engines

MTU DB 720F/PTL6
MTU DB 721/PTL10
MTU DB 730F/PTL6
MTU DB 730H/ZTL6
MTU 6012
MTU 6022

Mudry
(Moteurs Mudry-Buchoux)
Mudry MB-4-80
Mudry MB-4-90

Mulag
Mulag 90/113hp 6-cyl in-line 

Murray-Willat
Murray Ajax
Murray Atlas
Murray-Willat 35hp 6-cyl 2-stroke rotary 
Murray-Willat 90hp 6-cyl 2-stroke rotary 

MWfly
(MWfly srl, Passirana di Rho, Italy)
MWfly B22
MWfly B25

N

N.A.G.Source:Angle. NAG 40hp 4-cyl in-line
 NAG C.III
 NAG F.1 
 NAG F.2 
 NAG F.3 
 NAG F.4 
 NAG Model 301 
 NAG 6-cyl 135hp

Nagel
Nagel 444

Nagliati
 Nagliati V.N.V 160 hp Y-12 
 Nagliati 250hp 8-cyl twin4 

Nakajima

Nakajima Ha5
Nakajima Ha219
Nakajima Hikari
Nakajima Homare
Nakajima Kotobuki
Nakajima Mamoru
Nakajima Sakae 

NAMI

 NAMI A.M.B.20

NapierSources: Piston engines, Lumsden, gas turbine and rocket engines, Gunston.

Napier Cub
Napier Culverin
Napier Cutlass
Napier Dagger
Napier E.237 – Submission to the NGTE specification TE 10/56
Napier Eland
Napier Gazelle
Napier Javelin
Napier Lion
Napier Lioness
Napier Naiad
Napier Nomad
Napier Scorpion
Napier Double Scorpion
Napier Triple Scorpion
Napier Oryx
Napier Rapier
Napier RJTV (Ramjet test Vehicle)
Napier Sabre
Napier Sea Lion (marinised Lions)
Napier N.R.E. 17
Napier N.R.E. 19
Napier N.R.J. 1

Narkiewicz
(Wiktor N. Narkiewicz – production at C.Z.P.S.K. (National)
 Narkiewicz WN-1
 Narkiewicz WN-2
 Narkiewicz WN-3
 Narkiewicz WN-4
 Narkiewicz WN-6
 Narkiewicz WN-6R
 Narkiewicz WN-7
 Narkiewicz WN-7R
 Narkiewicz NP-1
 Narkiewicz 2-cyl.

Naskiewicz
(Stanislaw Naskiewicz)
 Naskiewicz gas turbine

National Aerospace Laboratory of Japan

MITI/NAL FJR710

National
National 35

N.E.C.
(New Engine Co.)
N.E.C. 1910 2-cyl 2-stroke
N.E.C. 1910 60hp 6-cyl 2-stroke
N.E.C. 40hp 4-cyl 2-stroke
N.E.C. 50hp V-4 2-stroke 
N.E.C. 90hp 6-cyl 2-stroke 
N.E.C. 100hp 6-cyl 2-stroke(1912)
N.E.C. 69.6hp 4-cyl 2-stroke 

Nelson

Nelson 60hp 4-stroke
Nelson 120hp 4-stroke
Nelson 150hp 4-stroke
Nelson H-44
Nelson H-49
Nelson H-56
Nelson H-59
Nelson H-63
Nelson O-65

Nielsen & Winther

 Nielsen & Winther M.A.J.

Nieuport

Nieuport 28hp 2-cyl opposed 
Nieuport 32/35hp 2-cyl opposed 

Nihonnainenki
Nihonnainenki Semi

Nippon
(Nippon Jet Engine Company)
 Nippon J0-1
 Nippon J0-3
 Nippon J1-1
 Nippon J3-1

Nord

Nord ST.600 Sirius I
Nord ST.600 Sirius II
Nord ST.600 Sirius III
Nord Véga

Normalair Garrett

NGL WAM 274
NGL WAM 342

NorthropSource:Gunston.Northrop Model 4318F
Northrop O-100
Northrop Turbodyne XT-37

Norton
(Kenneth Norton / Norton-Newby Motorcycle Co.)
Norton 2-cyl opposed 

Novus
 Novus 70hp 6-cyl rotary 
 Novus 70hp 6-cyl double rotary 

NPO Saturn

AL-31
AL-32
AL-34
AL-55

NPT

 NPT100
 NPT109
NPT151
NPT301
NPT301 LTD

NST-Machinenbau
(Niedergoersdorf, Germany)
NST BS 650

Nuffield
 Nuffield 100hp 4HO

O

Oberursel

Oberursel U.0
Oberursel U.I
Oberursel U.II
Oberursel U.III
Oberursel Ur.II
Oberursel Ur.III
Oberursel 200hp 18-cyl rotary 
Oberursel 240hp V-8

Oerlikon

 Oerlikon 50/60hp 4-cyl opposed 

Oldfield
 Oldfield 15A 

Omsk

 Omsk TVO-100

Opel

 Opel Argus As III

Orenda Engines
Orenda Engines, formed by Avro Canada taking over publicly funded jet engine development by Turbo Research. Later became Orenda Aerospace under Magellan.

Avro Canada Chinook 
Avro Canada Orenda
Orenda Iroquois 
Orenda OE600 
licence-built General Electric J79
licence-built General Electric J85

Orion
 Orion LL-30

Orlo
(Orlo Motor Company)
Orlo B-4 4IL 50 hp 
Orlo B-6 6IL 75 hp 
Orlo B-8 V-8 100 hp 

Orlogsværftet

 Orlogsværftet O.V. 160

OKL
(Ośrodek Konstrukcji Lotniczych WSK Okęcie)
OKL LIS-2
OKL LIS-2A
OKL LIS-5
OKL LIT-3
OKL TO-1
OKL NP-1
OKL WN-3 (Wiktor Narkiewicz)
OKL WN-6 (Wiktor Narkiewicz)
OKL WN-7 (Wiktor Narkiewicz)

Otis-Pifre
 Otis-Pifre 6-cyl in-line
 Otis-Pifer 500hp V-12 

Otto A.G.O.

 Otto A.G.O. 50 hp 
 Otto A.G.O. 70 hp 
 Otto A.G.O. 80/100 hp 
 Otto A.G.O. 100/130 hp 
 Otto 200hp 8 in-line

P

PackardSource:Gunston.Packard 1A-258 1922 single
Packard 1A-744 1919 V-8(60) 180 hp 
Packard 1A-825 1921 V-8(60) 
Packard 1A-905 225 hp V-12 
Packard 1A-1100 1917 V-8(45) – small scale production of Liberty L-8
Packard 1A-1116 1919 V-12(60) 282 hp 
Packard 1A-1237 1920 V-12(60) 315 hp 
Packard 2A-1237 1923 V-12(60)
Packard 1A-1300 1923 V-12(60)
Packard 1A-1464 1924 V-12(60) 1st redesign of 1A-1300
Packard 1A-1500 1924 V-12(60)
variants: Packard 2A-1500 1925 V-12(60), Packard 3A-1500 1927 V-12(60)
Packard 1M-1551 test engine
Packard 1A-1551 1921 IL-6
Packard 1A-1650 1919 Packard's post war Liberty
Packard 1A-2025 1920 V-12(60) 540 hp 
Packard 1A-2200 1923 V-12(60) (made as 6 cyl.)
Packard 1A-2500 1924 V-12
variants include 2A-2500, 2A-2540, 3A-2500, 4A-2500, 5A-2500, 3M-2500, 4M-2500, 5M-2500
Packard X-2775 – experimental X-24, three engines built
1A-2775, 2A-2775 (1935) 
Packard 1A-3000 193? H-24 "H" exp.
Packard 1A-5000 1939 X-24(60) exp.
Packard 2A-5000 1939 H-24 exp.
Packard 3A-5000 1939 X-24(90) exp. sleeve valve
Packard 1D-2270 1952 V-16(TD60)
Packard DR-980 1928 R-9(D) 1st diesel to fly
Packard DR-1340 1932 R-9(D) 2-cycle
Packard DR-1520 1932 R-9(D) 2-cycle
Packard DR-1655 1932 R-9(D) exp. diesel
Packard 299 1916 V-12(60) "299" racer engine
Packard 452 1917 IL-6 aero exp.
Packard 905-1 1916 V-12(40)
Packard 905-2 1917 V-12(40)
Packard 905-3 1917 V-12(40) (1A-905)
Packard IL-6 (1A-1551)
Packard L-8 (1A-1100) – licence-built Liberty L-12
Packard L-12 1917 Liberty L-12 engines
Packard L-12E 1918 U-12 Duplex – 2 crankshafts
Packard V-1650 – inverted Liberty L-12
Packard V-1650 Merlin – licence-built Rolls-Royce Merlin
Packard W-1 1921 W-18(40) Air Service-designed and Packard-built
Packard W-1-A 1923 W-18(40) Air Service-designed and Packard-built
Packard W-1-B 1923 W-18(40) Air Service-designed and Packard-built
Packard W-2 1923 W-18(40) Air Service designed
Packard XJ41 1946 Turbo-Jet Experimental turbojet. 7 were contracted
Packard XJ49 1948 Turbo-Fan Experimental fan jet. Highest thrust——jet built up to that time

Palmer
(Palmer Motor Company)
Palmer 80hp

Palons & Beuse
 Palons & Beuse 2-cyl opposed

Panhard & Levassor

Source:
(Société Panhard & Levassor)

Inline engines
Panhard & Levassor 4M – Dirigible engine with power outputs of 50 to 120 hp (1905–1911)
Panhard & Levassor 4I – 35/40 hp (1909)
Panhard & Levassor 6I – 55 hp (1910)
Panhard & Levassor 6J – 65 hp (1910)
V8 engines
Panhard & Levassor V8 – 100 hp (1912)
V12 engines
Panhard & Levassor 12J – 220 hp (1915)
Panhard & Levassor 12M – 500 hp (1918)
V12 sleeve valve engines
Panhard & Levassor VL 12L – 450 hp (1924)
Panhard & Levassor VK 12L – 450 hp (1925)
W16 engines
Panhard & Levassor 16W – 650 hp (1920)

Parker
(Aero Parker Motor Sales Company)
Parker 1912 3 cyl
Parker 1912 6 cyl

Parma Technik
(Luhačovice, Zlín Region, Moravia, Czech Republic)
Parma Mikron III UL

Parodi
(Roland Parodi)
Parodi HP 60Z

PBS
(První Brnenská Strojírna Velká Bíteš, a.s.)
 PBS TJ-20
 PBS TJ-40
 PBS TJ-100
 PBS Velka Bites ÒÅ 50Â

Pegasus Aviation
Pegasus PAL 95

Per Il Volo
Per Il Volo Top 80

Peterlot
Peterlot 80hp 7-cyl radial

Peugeot

 Peugeot 8A
 Peugeot L112 V-8 
 Peugeot Type 16AJ 440 hp double V-8 
 Peugeot L41 600 hp V-12 
 Peugeot Type 16X X-16 
 Peugeot 12L13

Pheasant Aircraft Company

 Pheasant Flight 4-cyl

Phillips
(Phillips Aviation Company)
Phillips 333 (Martin 333)
Phillips 500

PiaggioData from:Italian Civil & Military Aircraft 1930–1945 and Jane's 1938
Piaggio P.II (Armstrong Siddeley Lynx)
Piaggio Stella P.VII
Piaggio Stella P.IX
Piaggio P.X
Piaggio P.XI
Piaggio P.XII
Piaggio P.XV
Piaggio P.XVI
Piaggio P.XIX
Piaggio P.XXII
Piaggio-Jupiter
Piaggio Lycoming

Pierce
(Samuel S Pierce Airplane Company)
Pierce B 35 hp 3RA 

Pieper
(Pieper Motorenbau GmbH)
Pieper Stamo MS 1500
Pieper Stamo 1000

Pipistrel

Pipistrel E-811

PipeData from:Pipe 50hp V-8 
Pipe 110hp V-8

Pirna

Pirna 014

Platzer
Platzer MA 12 P/Nissan

Pobjoy

Pobjoy P
Pobjoy R
Pobjoy Cataract
Pobjoy Cascade
Pobjoy Niagara

Poinsard
 Poinsard 25hp 2-cyl

Porsche

Porsche 678
Porsche 702
Porsche PFM N00
Porsche PFM N01
Porsche PFM N03
Porsche PFM T03
Porsche PFM 3200
Porsche 109-005
Porsche YO-95-6

Potez

Potez A-4 50 hp 4IL upright 
Potez 1C APU
Potez 1D APU
Potez 1D-3 APU
Potez 2D APU
Potez 2D-2 APU
Potez 2D-5 APU
Potez 2C APU
Potez 3B
Potez 4D
Potez 4E
Potez 6A
Potez 6Aa
Potez 6Ab
Potez 6Ac
Potez 6B
Potez 6Ba
Potez 6D
Potez 6E
Potez 6E.30
Potez 8D
Potez 9A
Potez 9Ab
Potez 9Abr
Potez 9Ac
Potez 9B
Potez 9Ba
Potez 9Bb
Potez 9Bd
Potez 9C
Potez 9C-01
Potez 9E
Potez 9Eo
Potez 12As
Potez 12D (a.k.a. D.12)
Potez 12D-00
Potez 12D-01
Potez 12D-03
Potez 12D-30

Pouit
 Pouit S-4

PowerJet

PowerJet SaM146

Power Jets

Power Jets WU
Power Jets W.1
Power Jets W.2
Power Jets/Rover B/23 – Rolls-Royce Welland

Poyer
(Poyer Aircraft Engine Company)
Poyer 3-40
Poyer 3-50

PragaSource:Jane's All the World's Aircraft 1938
Praga B
Praga B2
Praga D
Praga DH
Praga DR
Praga ER
Praga ES
Praga ESV
Praga ESVKe
Praga ESVR
Praga FRK
Praga M-197 helicopter engine
Praga Doris B
Praga Doris M-208B
Praga E-I
Praga BD 500

Pratt & Whitney

Pratt & Whitney H-2600 – enlarged X-1800
Pratt & Whitney X-1800
Pratt & Whitney XH-3130 – cancelled
Pratt & Whitney XH-3730 – cancelled
Pratt & Whitney R-985 Wasp Junior
Pratt & Whitney R-1340 Wasp
Pratt & Whitney R-1535 Twin Wasp Junior
Pratt & Whitney R-1690 Hornet
Pratt & Whitney R-1830 Twin Wasp
Pratt & Whitney R-1860 Hornet B
Pratt & Whitney R-2000 Twin Wasp
Pratt & Whitney R-2060 Yellow Jacket
Pratt & Whitney R-2180-A Twin Hornet
Pratt & Whitney R-2180-E Twin Wasp E
Pratt & Whitney R-2270
Pratt & Whitney R-2800 Double Wasp
Pratt & Whitney R-4360 Wasp Major
Pratt & Whitney JT3
Pratt & Whitney JT3C – company designation for J57
Pratt & Whitney JT3D
Pratt & Whitney JT4 – company designation for J75
Pratt & Whitney JT4A – company designation for J75
Pratt & Whitney JT4D
Pratt & Whitney JT7
Pratt & Whitney JT8
Pratt & Whitney JT8D
Pratt & Whitney JT9D
Pratt & Whitney JT10D
Pratt & Whitney JT11D
Pratt & Whitney JT12A
Pratt & Whitney JT18D
Pratt & Whitney JTF10A – company designation of Pratt & Whitney TF30
Pratt & Whitney JTF16
Pratt & Whitney JTF17
Pratt & Whitney JTF22 – company designation of Pratt & Whitney F100
Pratt & Whitney JFTD12 – company designation of Pratt & Whitney T73
Pratt & Whitney JTN9
Pratt & Whitney PT1 (T32)
Pratt & Whitney PT2 – company designation of Pratt & Whitney T34
Pratt & Whitney PT4
Pratt & Whitney PT5
Pratt & Whitney PW1000G
Pratt & Whitney PW1120
Pratt & Whitney PW1130
Pratt & Whitney PW2000
Pratt & Whitney PW3000
Pratt & Whitney PW3005
Pratt & Whitney PW4000
Pratt & Whitney PW6000
Pratt & Whitney RL-10
Pratt & Whitney ST9
Pratt & Whitney STF300
Pratt & Whitney LR115
Pratt & Whitney F100
Pratt & Whitney F105 – US military designation of JT9D
Pratt & Whitney F117 (PW2037) – military designation of Pratt & Whitney PW2000
Pratt & Whitney F119 (PW5000)
Pratt & Whitney F135
Pratt & Whitney F401 – USN designation for F100
Pratt & Whitney J42 (licence built Rolls-Royce Nene)
Pratt & Whitney J48 (licence built Rolls-Royce RB.44 Tay)
Pratt & Whitney J52 (JT84)
Pratt & Whitney J57
Pratt & Whitney J58
Pratt & Whitney J60 – military designation of JT12
Pratt & Whitney J75
Pratt & Whitney J91
Pratt & Whitney RJ40 Ramjet
Pratt & Whitney T32 – US military designation of PT1
Pratt & Whitney T34
Pratt & Whitney T45
Pratt & Whitney T48
Pratt & Whitney T52
Pratt & Whitney XT57
Pratt & Whitney T73
Pratt & Whitney T101 – military designation of Pratt & Whitney Canada PT6-45A)
Pratt & Whitney T400 – military designation of Pratt & Whitney Canada PT6T
Pratt & Whitney TF30
Pratt & Whitney TF33
Pratt & Whitney / SNECMA TF104, TF106, TF306 -variants of Pratt & Whitney TF30 by SNECMA

Pratt & Whitney/Allison
PW-Allison 578DX

Pratt & Whitney Canada

Pratt & Whitney Canada PT6
Pratt & Whitney Canada PT6T
Pratt & Whitney Canada ST6
Pratt & Whitney Canada JT15D
Pratt & Whitney Canada PW100
Pratt & Whitney Canada PW200
Pratt & Whitney Canada PW300
Pratt & Whitney Canada PW500
Pratt & Whitney Canada PW600
Pratt & Whitney Canada PW800
Pratt & Whitney Canada T74
Pratt & Whitney Canada T101
Pratt & Whitney Canada T400

Pratt & Whitney Rzeszów
 Pratt & Whitney Rzeszów PZL-10

Preceptor
Preceptor 1/2 VW
Preceptor 1600cc
Preceptor Gold 1835
Preceptor Gold 2074
Preceptor 2180cc

Price Induction

DGEN

Primi-Berthand
 Primi-Berthand 4-cyl in-line 2-stroke 

Pulch
(Otto Pulch)
Pulch 003
Pulch 3-cyl. radial

Pulsar
Pulsar Aeromaxx 100

PZI
(Państwowe Zakłady Inżynieryjne – National Engineering Works)
 P.Z. Inż. Junior 120 hp
 P.Z. Inż. Major
 P.Z. Inż. Minor

PZL
(PZL Państwowe Zakłady Lotnicze)

PZL Rzeszów
(PZL Rzeszów)
 PZL Rzeszów SO-1
 PZL Rzeszów SO-3

PZL-Wytwórnia Silników
PZL GR.760
PZL GR.1620-A
PZL GR.1620-B
PZL-3 – Ivchenko AI-26
PZL-10
PZL GTD-350 – Klimov GTD-350
PZL-Kalisz ASz-61R
PZL ASz-62 – Shvetsov ASh-62
PZL-F 2A – Franklin 2 series
PZL-F 4A – licence built Franklin Engine Company
PZL-F 6A – licence built Franklin Engine Company
PZL-F 6V – licence built Franklin Engine Company
PZL-65KM
PZL K-15

Q

Quick Air Motors Co
(Quick Air Motors, Wichita KS.)
Quick Super Rhone – conversion of 80hp Le Rhône 9C rotary engine to radial. 
Quick 180hp

R

Radne Motor AB
Radne Raket 120

Ranger
Ranger Engines were a division of Fairchild Aircraft
Ranger 6-370
Ranger 6-375
Ranger 6-390
Ranger 6-410
Ranger L-440 (company designation 6-440)
Ranger V-770
Ranger V-880
Ranger XV-920
Ranger XH-1850 (not actually an H – a double 150° V – two separate crankshafts linked by a gearbox)

Rapp
Rapp Motorenwerke became BMW in 1917
 Rapp 100 hp
 Rapp 125/145 hp
 Rapp Rp III 
 Rapp 200 hp

Rasmussen
(Hans L Rasmussen)
Rasmussen 65hp

Rateau

 Rateau GTS.65
 Rateau A.65 gas turbine
 Rateau SRA-01 Savoie
 Rateau SRA-101 10-stage axial compressor
 Rateau SRA-301 16-stage axial compressor

Rausenberger
Rausenberger A-8 45 hp V-8 
Rausenberger B-8 75 hp V-8 
Rausenberger C-12 150 hp V-12 
Rausenberger D-23 250 hp V-12 
Rausenberger E-6 150 hp 6IL 
Rausenberger 500hp

Raven Redrives

Raven 1000 UL
Raven 1300 SVS Turbo
Raven 1600 SV

RBVZ

RBVZ-6 (V.V. Kireev)
MRB-6 (Igor Sikorsky)

Reaction Motors

Reaction Motors LR2
Reaction Motors LR6
Reaction Motors LR8
Reaction Motors LR10
Reaction Motors LR11
Reaction Motors LR22
Reaction Motors LR26
Reaction Motors LR30
Reaction Motors LR32
Reaction Motors LR33
Reaction Motors LR34
Reaction Motors LR35
Reaction Motors LR39
Reaction Motors LR40
Reaction Motors LR44 Guardian
Reaction Motors LR48
Reaction Motors LR99
Reaction Motors 6000C4
Reaction Motors ROR
Reaction Motors Patriot
Reaction Motors TU205

Rearwin

Rearwin 1909 30-45hp
Rearwin 1909 40-60hp
Rearwin 1910 50-75hp
Rearwin 1911 80-90hp

Rebus
 Rebus 50hp 4-cyl

Rectimo
(Rectimo Aviation SA) / (Rectimo-Savoie Aviation)
Rectimo 4 AR 1200
Rectimo 4 AR 1600

RED
RED Aircraft GmbH
 RED A03 – V12 four-stroke iesel engine

Redrup
Redrup 1910 50hp 10-cyl contra-rotating rotary
Redrup 1914 150hp 7-cyl radial
Redrup 5-cyl barrel engine
Redrup Fury (barrel engine built by Aero Syndicate Ltd.)

Reggiane

 Reggiane Re 101 R.C.50 I (sometimes designated Re L 101 R.C.50 I)
 Reggiane Re 102 R.C.50 I (inverted W-18)
 Reggiane Re 103 R.C.40 I (inverted W-18)
 Reggiane Re 103 R.C.50 I (inverted W-18)
 Reggiane Re 103 R.C.57 I (inverted W-18)
 Reggiane Re 103 R.C.48 (inverted W-18)
 Reggiane Re 104 R.C.38 (V-12 derived from the Isotta Fraschini Asso L.121 R.C.40)
 Reggiane Re 105 R.C.100 I (inverted W-18)
 Reggiane H-24

Régnier

Régnier R1
Régnier 2
Régnier 4B (derived from de Havilland Gipsy)
Régnier 4D.2
Régnier 4E.0
Régnier 4F.0
Régnier 4JO
Régnier 4KO
Régnier 4LO
Régnier 4L
Régnier 4R
Régnier 6B
Régnier 6C
Régnier 6GO
Régnier 6R
Régnier 6RS
Régnier R161-01
Régnier Martinet
Régnier 12Hoo

Renard
(Société anonyme des avions et moteurs Renard / Alfred Renard, Belgium) 
 Renard Type 7 7RA
 Renard Type 100 5RA
 Renard Type 120 5RA
 Renard Type 200 9RA
 Renard Type 400 18RA (twin-row type 200)

Renard

 Renard y Krebs

Renault

(Source: and)
 Note: some of the early Renaults seem to have oversquare cylinders and may be listed with bore and stroke transposed below.

Renault 38.5hp 4-cyl in-line 
Renault 42.5hp 4-cyl in-line 
Renault 25/30hp 4-cyl in-line 
Renault 35-40hp V-4
Renault 35hp V-8 
Renault 35hp V-8 
Renault 45hp V-8 
Renault 50hp V-8 
Renault 50.5hp V-8 
Renault 60hp V-8 
Renault 70hp Type WB 
Renault 70hp Type WC
Renault 75hp V-8 
Renault 80hp Type WS 
Renault 90hp V-8 
Renault 100hp V-8
Renault 130hp V-8
Renault 90hp V-12 12D
Renault 100hp V-12 
Renault 120hp V-12
Renault 138hp V-12 
Renault 190hp V-12
Renault 200hp V-12
Renault 220hp V-12 12E
Renault 265hp V-12
Renault 300hp V-12 12F
Renault 320hp V-12 12Fe
Renault 38.5hp 4-cyl in-line water-cooled
Renault 42.5hp 4-cyl in-line water-cooled airship engine
Renault 7A  7 radial
Renault 8A  V-8
Renault 8Aa  V-8
Renault 8Ab  V-8
Renault 9A
Renault 4B 25 hp V-4 1910
Renault 8B  V-8
Renault 8C  V-8
Renault 8Ca  V8
Renault 9C
Renault 9Ca  9 radial
Renault 12D
Renault 12Da 
Renault 12Db  V12
Renault 12Dc  V12
Renault 12Drs  V12
Renault 12E  V12
Renault 12Eb 
Renault 12Ec  V12
Renault 9F
Renault 9Fas  9 radial
Renault 12F
Renault 12Fa  V12
Renault 12Fb  V12
Renault 12Fc  V12
Renault 12Fe  V12
Renault 12Fex  V-12
Renault 14Fas  14 radial
Renault 8G  to  V8
Renault 12H
Renault 12Ha  V12
Renault 12Hd  V12
Renault 12He  V12
Renault 12Hg  V12
Renault 12J
Renault 12Ja  V12
Renault 12Jb  V12
Renault 12Jc  V12
Renault 18J
Renault 18Jbr  W18
Renault 12K (aka 450 hp and 500 hp)
Renault 12K1? 
Renault 12Ka
Renault 12Kb  V12
Renault 12Kd
Renault 12Ke  V12
Renault 12Kg  V12
Renault 12M  V12
Renault 12Ma
Renault 12N
Renault 12Ncr 
 Renault 12O  air-cooled V-12 inverted
Renault 4P
Renault 6P
Renault 9P 9 radial (aka 250 hp air-cooled engine)
Renault 9Pa  
Renault 6Q 
Renault 12R  air-cooled V-12 inverted
Renault 12S  V-12 inverted
Renault 14T
Renault 12T  V-12 inverted
Renault Bengali 4
Renault Bengali 6
 Renault Type WB
 Renault Type WC
 Renault Type WS
 Renault Moteur Coupe Deutsch 6 inline  (109.75x140), turbocharged
 Renault 438 (Coupe Deutsch) 180 hp 6 in-line
 Renault 446 450 hp V-12?
 Renault 454 220 hp 6 in-line
 Renault 456 300 hp 6 in-line
 Renault 468 730 hp inverted V-12
 Renault 626 800 hp inverted V-8?
 Renault 8? 200 hp 8 cyl in-line water-cooled

R.E.P.

R.E.P. 20/24hp 5-cyl. 
R.E.P. 30/34hp 7-cyl. 
R.E.P. 95hp 7-cyl. 
R.E.P. 40/48hp 10-cyl. 
R.E.P. 60hp 14-cyl. 
R.E.P. 60hp 5-cyl fan 
R.E.P. 50hp 5-cyl fan 
R.E.P. 75hp 6-cyl
R.E.P. 60hp 7-cyl
R.E.P. 85hp 7-cyl radial 

Revmaster
 Revmaster R-800 2cyl 27 hp (Citroën 2CV)
 Revmaster R-1600D VW
 Revmaster R-1600S
 Revmaster R-1831D
 Revmaster R-1831S
 Revmaster R-2100D
 Revmaster R-2100D Turbo 70 hp at 3,200 rpm
 Revmaster R-2100S 65 hp at 3,200 rpm
 Revmaster R-2300
 Revmaster R-3000D 110 hp at 3,200 rpm

Rex
(Flugmachine Rex GesellschaftG.m.b.H.)
Rex rotary engine

RFB

RFB SG 85
RFB SG 95

Rheem

 Rheem S-10 axial

Rheinische
 Rheinische 35hp 3-cyl fan 
 Rheinische 50/60hp 5-cyl radial 
 Rheinische 70hp 4-cyl in-line 
 Rheinische 100hp 6-cyl in-line 

Rheinmetall-Borsig

Rheinmetall 109-502
Rheinmetall 109-505
Rheinmetall 109-515 rocket (solid fuel)
Rheinmetall Rheintochter R 1 first stage
Rheinmetall Rheintochter R 1 second stage
Rheinmetall Rheintochter R 3 first stage

Rhenania
(Rhenania Motorenwerke)
 Rhenania 11-cyl. rotary engine

Ricardo
Ricardo-Burt S55/4
Ricardo-Halford-Armstrong R.H.A.

Richard & Hering
(Rex-Simplex Automobilwerke)
 Richard & Hering engines

Richardson
(Archibald and Mervyn, Sydney Australia)
 Richardson rotary

Righter Manufacturing
Righter O-15 
Righter O-45

Roberts
(Roberts Motor Company / E.W. Roberts, Sandusky. Ohio)
Roberts 50hp 4-cyl in-line 
Roberts 75hp 6-cyl in-line 
Roberts 4-X.
Roberts 6-X 100 hp 
Roberts 6-XX 200 hp 
Roberts 6-Z
Roberts E-12 350 hp 

Robinson
(Grinnell Aeroplane Co. / William C. Robinson)
Robinson 60hp
Robinson 100hp

Robinson

 Robinson R-13

Roché
(Jean A Roché)
Roché L-267

Rocket Propulsion Establishment

 RPE Gamma

Rocketdyne

 Rocketdyne 16NS-1,000
 Rocketdyne AR1
 Rocketdyne AR2
 Rocketdyne LR36 (AR1)
 Rocketdyne LR42 (AR2)
 Rocketdyne LR64
 Rocketdyne LR79
 Rocketdyne LR89
 Rocketdyne LR101
 Rocketdyne LR105
 Rocketdyne Aeolus
 Rocketdyne A-7 Redstone
 Rocketdyne E-1
 Rocketdyne F-1 (RP-1/LOX) Saturn V.
 Rocketdyne H-1 (RP-1/LOX) Saturn I, Saturn IB, Jupiter, and some Deltas
 Rocketdyne J-2 (LH2/LOX) Saturn V and Saturn IB.
 Rocketdyne M-34
 Rocketdyne MA-2
 Rocketdyne MA-3
 Rocketdyne MB-3
 Rocketdyne MB-93
 Rocketdyne P-4
 Rocketdyne RS-25 (LH2/LOX) Used by the Space Shuttle
 Rocketdyne RS-27A (RP-1/LOX) Used by the Delta II/III and Atlas ICBM
 Rocketdyne RS-68 (LH2/LOX) Used by the Delta IV Heavy core stage
 Rocketdyne Kiwi Nuclear rocket engine
 Rocketdyne Megaboom modular sled rocket
 Rocketdyne Vernier engine Atlas, some Thor with MA-2 & MB-3

Rocky Mountain
Rocky Mountain Pegasus

Rollason

Rollason Ardem RTW
Rollason Ardem 4 CO2 FH mod

Rolls-Royce LimitedSources: Piston engines, Lumsden, gas turbine and rocket engines, Gunston.Note: For alternative 'RB' gas turbine designations please see the Rolls-Royce aero engine template.Rolls-Royce 190hp
Rolls-Royce 250hp
Rolls-Royce Avon
Rolls-Royce Bristol Olympus
Rolls-Royce Buzzard
Rolls-Royce Clyde
Rolls-Royce Condor
Rolls-Royce Condor diesel
Rolls-Royce Conway
Rolls-Royce Crecy
Rolls-Royce Dart
Rolls-Royce Derwent
Rolls Royce Eagle (H-24)
Rolls-Royce Eagle (V-12)
Rolls-Royce Eagle (X-16)
Rolls-Royce Exe
Rolls-Royce Falcon
Rolls-Royce Gem
Rolls-Royce Gnome
Rolls-Royce Goshawk
Rolls-Royce Griffon
Rolls-Royce Hawk
Rolls-Royce Kestrel
Rolls-Royce Merlin
Rolls-Royce Nene
Rolls-Royce Olympus
Rolls-Royce Pegasus
Rolls-Royce Pennine
Rolls-Royce Peregrine
Rolls-Royce R
Rolls-Royce RB.44 Tay
Rolls-Royce RB.50 Trent
Rolls-Royce RB.106
Rolls-Royce RB.108
Rolls-Royce RB.141 Medway
Rolls-Royce RB.145
Rolls-Royce/MAN Turbo RB153
Rolls-Royce RB.162
Rolls-Royce RB.175
Rolls-Royce RB.181
Rolls-Royce/MAN Turbo RB193
Rolls-Royce RB.203 Trent
Rolls-Royce RB.207
Rolls-Royce RB211
Rolls-Royce Soar
Rolls-Royce Spey
Rolls-Royce Tweed
Rolls-Royce Tyne
Rolls-Royce Viper
Rolls-Royce Vulture
Rolls-Royce Welland
Rolls-Royce/Continental C90
Rolls-Royce/Continental O-200
Rolls-Royce/Continental O-240
Rolls-Royce/Continental O-300
Rolls-Royce/Continental GIO-470
Rolls-Royce/Continental IO-520
Rolls-Royce RZ.2
Rolls-Royce RZ.12

Rolls-Royce HoldingsNote: For alternative 'RB' gas turbine designations please see the Rolls-Royce aero engine template.Rolls-Royce Trent
Rolls-Royce AE 1107C-Liberty
Rolls-Royce AE 2100
Rolls-Royce AE 3007
Rolls-Royce AE 3010
Rolls-Royce AE 3012
Rolls-Royce BR700
Rolls-Royce BR701
Rolls-Royce BR710
Rolls-Royce BR715
Rolls-Royce RB.183 Tay
Rolls-Royce RB.200
Rolls-Royce RB.202
Rolls-Royce RB.203 Trent 
Rolls-Royce RB.207
Rolls-Royce RB.213
Rolls-Royce RB.220
Rolls-Royce RB401
Rolls-Royce 250 – Allison Model 250
Rolls-Royce RR300
Rolls-Royce RR500
Rolls-Royce 501
Rolls-Royce F113 – (Spey Mk.511)
Rolls-Royce F126 – (Tay Mk.611 / 661)
Rolls-Royce F137 (AE3007H)
Rolls-Royce F402 – (Rolls Royce Pegasus)
Rolls-Royce J99
Rolls-Royce XV99-RA-1
Rolls-Royce T56 (T501-D)
Rolls-Royce T68
Rolls-Royce T406

Rolls-Royce Turbomeca

Rolls-Royce Turbomeca Adour 
Rolls-Royce Turbomeca RTM322

Rolls-Royce/SNECMA
Rolls-Royce/Snecma Olympus 593
Rolls-Royce/SNECMA M45H

Rossel-Peugeot
(Frédéric Rossel et les frères Peugeot)
Rossel-Peugeot 100hp 4-cyl in-line 
Rossel-Peugeot 30hp 7-cyl rotary 
Rossel-Peugeot 40hp 7-cyl rotary 
Rossel-Peugeot 50hp 7-cyl rotary 

Rotax

Rotax 185
Rotax 277
Rotax 377
Rotax 447
Rotax 462
Rotax 503
Rotax 508UL
Rotax 532
Rotax 535
Rotax 582
Rotax 642
Rotax 618
Rotax 804
Rotax 912
Rotax 914
Rotax 915 iS

Rotec
Rotec R2800
Rotec R3600

Rotex Electric

Rotex Electric REB 20
Rotex Electric REB 30
Rotex Electric REB 50
Rotex Electric REB 90
Rotex Electric REG 20
Rotex Electric REG 30
Rotex Electric RET 30
Rotex Electric RET 60
Rotex Electric REX 30
Rotex Electric REX 50
Rotex Electric REX 90

RotorWay

RotorWay RI-162F
RotorWay RW-100
RotorWay RW-133
RotorWay RW-145
RotorWay RW-152

Rotron

Rotron RT300
Rotron RT600

Rover
 
Rover Gas Turbines Ltd.
Rover W.2B
Rover Marton
Rover Moreton
Rover Napton
Rover Wolston
Rover T.P.90
Rover/Lucas TJ125 (CT3201)
Rover 1S60
Rover 1S/60
Rover 2S/150A
Rover 748
Rover 801
Rover TJ-125

Royal Aircraft Establishment

 RAE 21
 RAE 22

Royal Aircraft Factory

RAF 1
RAF 2
RAF 3
RAF 4
RAF 5
RAF 7
RAF 8

RRJAEL
(Rolls-Royce and Japanese Aero-engines Ltd.)
RRJAEL RJ.500

Rumpler

Rumpler Aeolus

Ruston-Proctor
 Ruston-Proctor 200hp 6-stroke rotary(6-cyl 2-stroke?)

Ryan-Siemens
(Ryan Aeronautical Corp/Siemens-Halske)
Ryan-Siemens 5 (Sh-13)
Ryan-Siemens 7 (Sh-14)
Ryan-Siemens 9 (Sh-12)
Ryan-Siemens Sh-14

Rybinsk Motor Factory
 DN-200
 Rybinsk RD-36-35
 Rybinsk RD-38

S

SACMA
(Guy Negre) 
SACMA 100
SACMA 120
SACMA 150
SACMA 180
SACMA 240

Safran Helicopter Engines

 Safran Arrano
 Safran Aneto

SAI Ambrosini

 Ambrosini P-25 – 2-cyl. horizontally opposed

Salmson

Salmson air-cooled aero-engines
Salmson 3A, 3Ad 
Salmson 5A, 5Ac, 5Ap, 5Aq 
Salmson 6A, 6Ad, 6Af
Salmson 6TE, 6TE.S
Salmson 7A, 7AC, 7ACa, 7Aq
Salmson 7M 
Salmson 7O, 7Om 
Salmson 9AB, 9ABa, 9ABc 
Salmson 9AC
Salmson 9AD 
Salmson 9AE, 9AEr, 9AErs
Salmson 9NA, 9NAs, 9NC, 9ND, 9NE, 9NH 
Salmson 11B 
Salmson 12C W-12?
Salmson 12V, 12Vars – V-12

Salmson water-cooled aero-engines
Salmson A – 2x7-cylinder barrel engine, 1 built
Salmson B – 2x7-cylinder barrel engine, 1 built
Salmson C – 2x7-cylinder barrel engine, 1 built
Salmson E – 2x9-cylinder barrel engine, 1 built
Salmson F – 2x9-cylinder barrel engine, 1 built
Salmson G – 2x7-cylinder barrel engine, 1 built
Salmson K – 2x7-cylinder barrel engine, 1 built
Salmson A.7 
Salmson A.9 
Salmson 2A.9 – a 2-row radial engine
Salmson B.9 water-cooled radial engine
Salmson C.9 water-cooled radial engine
Salmson M.9 water-cooled radial engine
Salmson P.9 water-cooled radial engine
Salmson R.9 water-cooled radial engine
Salmson M.7 water-cooled radial engine
Salmson 2M.7 water-cooled 2-row radial engine
Salmson 9.Z, 9.Za, 9.Zc, 9.Zm

Salmsons 18 cylinder in-line radial engines
Salmson 18Z (1919) 9-bank water-cooled in-line radial 2 x 9Z on common 2-throw crankshaft
Salmson 18AB (1920s) 9-bank air-cooled in-line radial
Salmson 18Cm, 18Cma, 18Cmb – (late 20s early 30s) 9-bank water-cooled (air-cooled heads) in-line radial
Salmson-Szydlowski SH.18 – 18-cyl 2-stroke radial diesel engine (nine banks of two in-line) 
Licence-built
Argus As 10 – as Salmson 8As.00, 8As.04

Saroléa

 Saroléa V-4
 Saroléa Albatros  30 hp 2HO
 Saroléa Aiglon
 Saroléa Vautour 32 hp 2HO
 Saroléa Epervier 25 hp 2HO

S.A.N.A.
 S.A.N.A. 700hp

Saunders-Roe

 Saunders-Roe 45 lbf pulse-jet
 Saunders-Roe 120 lbf pulse-jet

Sauer

 Sauer S 1800
 Sauer S 1800 UL
 Sauer S 1900 UL
 Sauer S 2100
 Sauer S 2100 UL
 Sauer S 2200 UL
 Sauer S 2400 UL
 Sauer S 2500
 Sauer S 2500 UL
 Sauer S 2700 UL

Saurer

 GT-15
 YS-2
 YS-3
 YS-4

Scania-Vabis

 Scania-Vabis PD

Schliha
(Schlüpmannsche Industrie und Handelsgesellschaft)
 Schliha 36hp 2-cyl
 Schliha F-1200

Schmidding

Schmidding 109-505 rocket (solid fuel)
Schmidding 109-513
Schmidding 109-533
Schmidding 109-543
Schmidding 109-553
Schmidding 109-563
Schmidding 109-573
Schmidding 109-593
Schmidding 109-603

Schroeter
 Schroeter 89hp 6-cyl in-line 

Schwade
(Otto Schwade GmbH, Erfurt, Germany)
 Schwade Stahlherz engine

SCI Aviation

 R6-80
 R6-150
 B4-160

Scott

Scott A2S Flying Squirrel
Scott 40hp 2-stroke
Scott 1939 2-stroke
Scott 1950 2-stroke V4

Security
(Security Aircraaft Corporation)
 Security S-5-120

Sega
 Sega trunnion radial engine

SELA
(Société d'Etude pour la Locomotion Aérienne [SELA])
 SELA V-8

Seld
(Seld-Kompressorbau G.m.b.H.)
Seld F2

SEPR

SEPR 9
SEPR 16
SEPR 24
SEPR 25
SEPR 35
SEPR 44
SEPR 50
SEPR 55
SEPR 57
SEPR 63
SEPR 65
SEPR 66
SEPR 73
SEPR 732
SEPR 734
SEPR 7341
SEPR 737
SEPR 738
SEPR 739 (Stromboli)
SEPR 78
SEPR 81A
SEPR 167
SEPR 178
SEPR 189
SEPR 192
SEPR 200 (Tramontane)
SEPR 201
SEPR 202
SEPR 2020
SEPR 251
SEPR 481
SEPR 504
SEPR 505
SEPR 5051
SEPR 5052
SEPR 50531
SEPR 5054
SEPR 631
SEPR 683
SEPR 684
SEPR 685
SEPR 6854
SEPR 686
SEPR 703
SEPR 705
SEPR 706
SEPR 740
SEPR 841
SEPR 844
SEPR Topaze
SEPR Diamante
SEPR C2

Sergant
Sergant A

SERMEL
SERMEL TRS 12
SERMEL TRS 18
SERMEL TRS 25

SFFA
(Société Française de Fabrication Aéronautique, France)
 SFFA Type A 100 hp 7-cyl
 SFFA Type B 45 hp 3-cyl

SFECMAS

 SFECMAS Ars 600
 SFECMAS Ars 900
 SFECMAS 12H
 SFECMAS 12K

Shenyang

Shenyang PF-1
Shenyang Aircraft Development Office PF-1A
Shenyang WP-5
Shenyang WP-6
Shenyang WP-7
Shenyang WP-14 ("Kunlun")
Shenyang WS-5
Shenyang WS-6
Shenyang WS-8
Shenyang WS-10

Shimadzu

 Shimadzu 80hp 9-cyl rotary 
 Shimadzu 90hp V-8  

ShvetsovData from:Russian Piston Aero Engines

Shvetsov M-11 
Shvetsov M-3
Shvetsov M-25
Shvetsov M-62
Shvetsov M-63
Shvetsov M-64
Shvetsov M-65
Shvetsov M-70
Shvetsov M-71
Shvetsov M-72
Shvetsov M-80
Shvetsov M-81
Shvetsov M-82
Shvetsov ASh-2
Shvetsov ASh-3
Shvetsov ASh-4
Shvetsov ASh-21
Shvetsov ASh-62
Shvetsov ASh-72 (M-72?)
Shvetsov ASh-73
Shvetsov ASh-82
Shvetsov ASh-83
Shvetsov ASh-84
Shvetsov ASh-90
Shvetsov ASh-93

S.H.K.
 S.H.K. 70hp 7-cyl rotary 
 S.H.K. 140hp 14-cyl rotary 
 S.H.K. 90hp 7-cyl rotary 
 S.H.K. 180hp 14-cyl rotary 

Siddeley-Deasy

Siddeley Ounce
Siddeley Pacific
Siddeley Puma
Siddeley Tiger

Siemens

Siemens SP90G
Siemens SP260D

Siemens-Halske

Siemens-Halske 100PS 9-cyl rotary  
 Siemens VI
Siemens-Halske Sh.0 
Siemens-Halske Sh.I 
Siemens-Halske Sh.II 
Siemens-Halske Sh.III
Siemens-Halske Sh 4
Siemens-Halske Sh 5
Siemens-Halske Sh 6
Siemens-Halske Sh 7
Siemens-Halske Sh 10
Siemens-Halske Sh 11
Siemens-Halske Sh 12
Siemens-Halske Sh 13
Siemens-Halske Sh 14 
Siemens-Halske Sh 15
Siemens-Bramo Sh 20
Siemens-Bramo Sh 21
Siemens-Bramo Sh 22
Siemens-Bramo Sh 25
Siemens-Bramo Sh 28
Siemens-Bramo Sh 29
Siemens Bramo SAM 22B
Siemens Bramo 314
Siemens Bramo 322
Siemens Bramo 323 Fafnir

Silnik
Silnik M 11
Silnik Sh 14

Simms
Simms 51hp V-6 

Simonini Racing

Simonini 200cc
Simonini Mini 2 Evo
Simonini Mini 2 Plus
Simonini Mini 3
Simonini Mini 4
Simonini Victor 1 Super
Simonini Victor 2
Simonini Victor 2 Plus
Simonini Victor 2 Super

Škoda

Skoda G-594 Czarny Piotruś
Skoda L
Skoda Lr
Skoda S.14
Skoda S.20
Skoda Hispano-Suiza W-12

Skymotors
Skymotors 70
Skymotors 70A

Smallbone
(Harry Eales Smallbone)
 Smallbone 4-cyl wobble-plate axial piston engine

Smalley
(General Machinery Co)
Smalley Aero

SMA Engines

SMA SR305-230
SMA SR460

Smith
Smith Static
Smith 300 hp radial 

SMPMC
(South Motive Power and Machinery Complex SMPMC prev Zhuzhou Aeroengine Factory)
SMPMC HS-5 – Chinese production of ShvetsovvASh-62
SMPMC HS-6 – Chinese production of Ivchenko AI-14
SMPMC WZ-8 – Chinese production of Turbomeca Arriel
SMPMC WZ-9
SMPMC WZ-16

SNCAN

 SNCAN Ars 600
 SNCAN Ars 900
 SNCAN Pulse-jet

SNECMASociété nationale d'études et de construction de moteurs d'aviation formed by nationalisation of Gnome et Rhône in 1945. On French engine designations even sub-series numbers (for example Gnome-Rhône 14N-68) rotated anti-clockwise (LH rotation) and were generally fitted on the starboard side, odd numbers (for example Gnome-Rhône 14N-69) rotated clockwise (RH rotation) and were fitted on the port side.

SNECMA Régnier 4L
SNECMA 12S/12T – post war Argus As 411 production
SNECMA-GR 14M – Gnome-Rhône 14M
SNECMA-GR 14N – Gnome-Rhône 14N
SNECMA 14NC Diesel 1945 1,015 hp
SNECMA 14R
SNECMA 14U 1948 2,200 hp(14R-1000)
SNECMA 14X Super Mars 1949 850 hp
SNECMA 14X-02
SNECMA 14X-04
SNECMA 14X-H
SNECMA 28T 1945 3,500 hp
SNECMA 32HL 1947 4,000 hp
SNECMA 36T 1948 4,150 hp
SNECMA 42T 1946 5,000 hp
SNECMA M26
SNECMA M28
SNECMA M45/Mars
Rolls-Royce/SNECMA M45H
SNECMA Turbomeca Larzac (M49)
SNECMA M53
SNECMA M88
SNECMA Atar 101
SNECMA Atar 8
SNECMA Atar 9
SNECMA Hercules – Bristol Hercules
Snecma Silvercrest
SNECMA-BMW 132Z
SNECMA / Pratt & Whitney TF104
SNECMA / Pratt & Whitney TF106
SNECMA / Pratt & Whitney TF306
SNECMA-Renault 4P
SNECMA-Renault 6Q
SNECMA Hispano 12B 1950 2,200 hp
SNECMA Hispano 12Y 1947 900 hp
SNECMA Hispano 12Z
SNECMA Super ATAR
SNECMA R.104 Vulcain
SNECMA R.105 Vesta
SNECMA Escopette
SNECMA Tromblon
SNECMA Ecrevisse Type A
SNECMA Ecrevisse Type B
SNeCMA AS.11
SNECMA S.402 A.3
SNECMA S.407 A.2
SNECMA TA-1000
SNECMA TB-1000

SNCM
(Société Nationale de Constructions de Moteurs – Lorraine post 1936)
 Lorraine Type 120 Algol
 Lorraine Type 111 Sterna
 Lorraine Type 112 Sirius

SOCEMA
(Société de Construction et d'Équipments Méchaniques pour l'Aviation)
SOCEMA TGA 1
SOCEMA TG 1008
SOCEMA TGAR 1008
SOCEMA TP.1
SOCEMA TP.2

Sodemo

Sodemo V2-1.0
Sodemo V2-1.2

Solar

Solar PJ32 pulse-jet
Solar T45 (Mars 50 hp gas turbine)
Solar T62 Titan
Solar T66 free turbine Titan
Solar T-150
Solar Centaur 40
Solar Centaur 50
Solar Jupiter (500 hp gas turbine)
Solar Mars 90
Solar Mars 100
Solar Mercury 50
Solar Saturn
Solar Saturn 10
Solar Saturn 20
Solar Taurus 60
Solar Taurus 65
Solar Taurus 70
Solar Titan 130
Solar Titan 250
Solar A-103B (early detachable afterburner for J34)
 Solar AAP-80
Solar M-80
Solar MA-1 (Mars)
Solar T-41M-1
Solar T-41M-2
Solar T-41M-5
Solar T-41M-6
Solar T-45M-1 (Mars)
Solar T-45M-2
Solar T-45M-7
Solar T-300J-2
Solar T-520J
Solar T-522J

Solo
(Solo Kleinmotoren GmbH)
Solo 560, also known as the Hirth F-10, used in the Scheibe SF-24 Motorspatz
Solo 2350, widely used in motor-gliders
Solo 2625 01
Solo 2625 02, used in the Glaser-Dirks DG-500, Schempp-Hirth Ventus-2, Sportinė Aviacija LAK-20 etc.
Solo 2625 02i, a fuel-injected version used in the Schempp-Hirth Arcus and Schempp-Hirth Quintus self-launching gliders

SolovievSource:Gunston.Soloviev D-15
Soloviev D-20
Soloviev D-25V (TB-2BM)
Soloviev D-30
Soloviev D-30K (completely revised)
Soloviev D-90A

Soloy
(Soloy Conversions / Soloy Dual Pak Inc.)
 Soloy Dual Pac
 Soloy Turbine Pac

Soverini
(Soverini Freres et Cie)
 Soverini-Echard 4D
 Soverini-Echard 4DR

Soviet union experimental engines

 AD-1 (diesel engine)
 AD-3 (diesel engine)
 AD-5 (diesel engine)
 FED-8 (diesel engine)
 MB-100 (A.M. Dobrotvorskiy)
 MB-102 (A.M. Dobrotvorskiy)
 MSK (diesel engine)
 AN-1 (diesel engine)
 AN-1A (diesel engine)
 AN-1R (diesel engine) (geared)
 AN-1RTK (diesel engine) (geared, turbo-supercharged)
 AN-5 (diesel engine) (N – Neftyanoy – of crude oil type – 24-cyl rhombic opposed piston)
 AN-20 (diesel engine) (24-cyl rhombic opposed piston)
 BD-2A (diesel engine)
 M-1 (aero-engine) (V-12 a.k.a. M-116 – S.D. Kolosov)
 M-5-400
 M-9 (L.I. Starostin – swashplate engine)
 M-10 (diesel engine) (5-cyl radial)
 M-16 (aero-engine) (4-cyl horizontally opposed – S.D. Kolosov)
 M-20 (diesel engine) (48-cyl rhombic opposed piston)
 M-30 (diesel engine)
 M-31 (diesel engine)
 M-35 (diesel engine)
 M-40 (diesel engine)
 M-47 (aero-engine) – fitted to Ilyushin Il-20
 M-50R (diesel engine) (marine rhombic opposed piston)
 M-52 (diesel engine)
 M-87D (diesel engine)
 M-116 (aero-engine) (V-12 a.k.a. M-1 – S.D. Kolosov)
 M-127 (X-24 conrod free)
 M-127K (X-24 conrod free)
 M-130 (aircraft engine) (H-24)
 M-224 (diesel engine)
 M-501 (diesel engine)
 MB-4 (X-4 MB – O Motor Besshatunniy – con-rod free engine – S.S. Balandin)
 MB-4b (X-4 MB – O Motor Besshatunniy – con-rod free engine – S.S. Balandin)
 MB-8 (X-8 MB – O Motor Besshatunniy – con-rod free engine – S.S. Balandin)
 MB-8b (X-8 MB – O Motor Besshatunniy – con-rod free engine – S.S. Balandin)
 MF-45Sh (M-47)
 D-11 (diesel engine) (5-cyl radial based on the M-11)
 N-1 (diesel engine) (N – Neftyanoy – of crude oil type)
 N-2 (diesel engine)
 N-3 (diesel engine)
 N-4 (diesel engine)
 N-5 (diesel engine)
 N-6 (diesel engine)
 N-9 (diesel engine)
 OMB (OMB – O Motor Besshatunniy – con-rod free engine – S.S. Balandin)
 OMB-127 (X-12 MB – O Motor Besshatunniy – con-rod free engine – S.S. Balandin)
 OMB-127RN (X-12 MB – O Motor Besshatunniy – con-rod free engine – S.S. Balandin)

Soyuz
(AMNTK Soyuz)
 Soyuz R-79V-300
 Soyuz R-79M
 Soyuz R-179-300
 Soyuz VK-21
 Soyuz R134-300

SPA

 SPA 6A

Speer
Speer S-2-C

Sperry
(Lawrence Sperry Aircraft Co)
Sperry WBB 2-stroke

Spyker

 Spijker 135hp rotary

Sport Plane Power
(Sport Plane Power Inc.)
 Sport Plane Power K-100A

STAL

STAL Skuten
STAL Dovern

Star
(Star Engineering Co. ltd.)
Star 40hp

Stark
(Stark Flugzeugbau KG)
 Stark Stamo 1400

Statax
(Statax Engine Company Ltd. – prev. Statax-Motor of Zurich)
Statax 3cyl 10hp axial
Statax 5cyl 40hp axial
Statax 7cyl 80hp axial
Statax 10cyl 100hp axial

Stoewer

 Stoewer 125hp
 Stoewer 150hp
 Stoewer 180hp

Stratus 2000

Stratus EJ 22

Straughan
(Straughn Aircraft Corp)
Straughan AL-1000 (Ford model 1A)

Studebaker

H-9350 (24cyl 153.2 litres)

Studebaker-Waterman
Studebaker-Waterman S-1

Sturtevant

Sturtevant 1913 40hp
Sturtevant 1913 60hp
Sturtevant 5 140 hp V-8 
Sturtevant 5A 140 hp V-8 
Sturtevant 5A-4
Sturtevant 5A-4 210 hp V-8 
Sturtevant 7 300 hp V-12 
Sturtevant D-4 48 hp 4IL 
Sturtevant D-6 86 hp 6IL 
Sturtevant E-6 100 hp 6IL 

Subaru

Subaru EJ25
Subaru EA82

Sulzer

 Sulzer ATAR 09C

SunbeamSource: Lumsden.

Sunbeam 110 hp
Sunbeam 150 hp
Sunbeam 200 hp
Sunbeam 225 hp
Sunbeam Afridi
Sunbeam Amazon
Sunbeam Arab
Sunbeam Bedouin
Sunbeam Cossack
Sunbeam Crusader
Sunbeam Dyak
Sunbeam Gurkha
Sunbeam Kaffir
Sunbeam Malay
Sunbeam Maori
Sunbeam Manitou
Sunbeam Matabele
Sunbeam Mohawk
Sunbeam Nubian
Sunbeam Pathan
Sunbeam Saracen
Sunbeam Sikh
Sunbeam Semi-Sikh
Sunbeam Sikh II a.k.a. Semi-Sikh
Sunbeam Sikh III
Sunbeam Spartan
Sunbeam Tartar
Sunbeam Viking
Sunbeam Zulu

Sunbeam 2,000 hp – engine for Kaye Don's Silver Bullet land speed record car

Superior

Superior Air Parts XP-320
Superior Air Parts XP-360
Superior Air Parts XP-382
Superior Air Parts XP-400
Superior Air Parts Gemini Diesel 100
Superior Air Parts Gemini Diesel 125
Superior Air Parts Vantage

Survol-de Coucy
Survol-de Coucy Pygmée 40 hp

Svenska

Svenska Flygmotor P/15-54
IA R-19-SR/1 Indio
Svenska Flygmotor RM1 Goblin
Svenska Flygmotor RM2 Ghost
Svenska Flygmotor RM5 Avon
Svenska Flygmotor RM6 Avon
Svenska Flygmotor RR2
Svenska RM8
Svenska F-451-A Trollet
Svenska Flygmotor VR-3

Szekely
Szekely SR-3 O 3-cyl (SR – "Sky Roamer")
Szekely SR-3 L
Szekely SR-5 5-cyl
Szekely 100 7-cyl
Szekely O-125

T

Take Off

Take Off TBM 10
Take Off TBM 11
Take Off TBM 12

Tatra
 Tatra T100
 Tatra T101

TBS
(Turbinenbau Schuberth Schwabhausen GmbH)
 TBS 400N-J40P

TECSee: MoslerTechnopower
(Technopower Inc.)
Technopower Twin O-101

TEI

TEI PD170
TEI TS1400

Teledyne CAE

CAE 210 (XT51-1 – Turbomeca Artouste I) 280 shp
CAE 217-5 (XT72 – Turbomeca Astazou) 600shp
CAE 217-10 (XT65 – scaled down Astazou) 305 shp
CAE 217A (XT67 – coupled Turbomeca Astazou X)
CAE 220-2 (XT51-3 – Turbomeca Artouste II)
CAE 227
CAE 300
CAE 320 (Turbomeca Palas – 350 lbf thrust)
CAE 325 (Continental TS325-1?)
CAE 324
CAE 382
Continental T51 – (development of Turbomeca Artouste I) 280 shp
CAE T72 – (Turbomeca Astazou) 600shp
CAE T65 – (scaled down Astazou) 305 shp
CAE T67 – (coupled Turbomeca Astazou X)
Teledyne CAE 352
Teledyne CAE 354
Teledyne CAE 356
Teledyne CAE 365
Teledyne CAE 370
Teledyne CAE 372
Teledyne CAE 373
Teledyne CAE 382
Teledyne CAE 440
Teledyne CAE 455
Teledyne CAE 472 (see F106)
Teledyne CAE 490
Teledyne CAE 555
Teledyne CAE J69
Teledyne CAE LJ95
Teledyne CAE J100
Teledyne CAE J402
Teledyne CAE F106
Teledyne CAE F408
Teledyne CAE CJ69
Teledyne CAE TS120

Thaheld
Thaheld O-290 diesel

Thermo-Jet
(Thermo-Jet Standard Inc.)
Thermo-Jet J3-200
Thermo-Jet J5-200
Thermo-Jet J7-300
Thermo-Jet J8-200
Thermo-Jet J10-200
Thermo-Jet J13-202

Thames
(Thames Ironworks and Ship[building Co.Ltd.)
 Thames 30hp 4OW

Thielert

Thielert Centurion 1.7 
Thielert Centurion 4.0

Thiokol

Data from:Jane's All the World's Aircraft 1962-3

Thiokol LR44
Thiokol LR58
Thiokol LR62
Thiokol LR99
Thiokol M6 (TX-136)
Thiokol M10 (TX-10)
Thiokol M12 (TX-12)
Thiokol M16 (TX-16)
Thiokol M18 (TX-18)
Thiokol M19
Thiokol M20 (TX-20)
Thiokol M30 (TX-30)
Thiokol M33 (TX-33)
Thiokol M46
Thiokol M51 (TX-131-15)
Thiokol M55
Thiokol M58 (TX-58)
Thiokol TU-122
Thiokol TX-135
Thiokol TD-174 Guardian
Thiokol TE-29 Recruit
Thiokol TD-214 Pioneer
Thiokol TE-289 Yardbird
Thiokol TE-307 Apache

Thomas
(Thomas Aeromotor Company, United States)
Thomas 120hp 4-cyl in-line
Thomas 8 135 hp 
Thomas 88 150 hp 
Thomas 890 250 hp 

Thorotzkai
(Thorotzkai Péter alt, spelling Thoroczkay)
Thorotzkai 12hp
Thorotzkai 22hp 3cyl. radial
Thorotzkai 35hp opposed twin
Thorotzkai typ.7 35hp
Thorotzkai 120hp
Thorotzkai Gamma-III (35 hp 3cyl. radial)

Thulin

Thulin A (engine)
Thulin D (engine) (Le Rhône 18E ?)
Thulin E (engine)
Thulin G (engine) (Le Rhône 11F ?)

Thunder
(Thunder Engines Inc.)
Thunder TE495-TC700

Tiger
(The Light Manufacturing and Foundry Company)
 Tiger 100
 Tiger 125
 Tiger Kitten-20
 Tiger Kitten-30
 Tiger Junior 50

Tips
Tips 480hp 250 hp  (18 cyl., 1717.67 ci, air- and water-cooled rotary engine. At rated RPM the crankshaft rotated at 1800 rpm, propeller shaft at 1080 rpm and the engine body at 60 rpm. Cooling was by direct air flow and tubular radiators between the cylinders, with water circulating without hoses or pumps.)

Tips & Smith
Tips & Smith Super-Rhône

Tomonoo
(Tomon Naoji)
Tomono 90hp 6-cyl in-line 

Tone
 Tone 2V9 180 hp 

TNCA

TNCA Aztatl
TNCA Trebol

Tokyo Gasu Denk/Gasuden

Tokyo Gasu Denki Amakaze
Tokyo Gasu Denki Hatakaze
Tokyo Gasu Denki Jimpu 3
Tokyo Gasu Denki Kamikaze
Tokyo Gasu Denki Tempu
Gasuden Amakaze
Gasuden Hatakaze
Gasuden Jimpu 3
Gasuden Kamikaze
Gasuden Tempu

Torque Master
(Valley Engineering)
 Torque Master 1835cc
 Torque Master 1915cc
 Torque Master 2180cc

Tosi

 Tosi 450hp V-12 

Total Engine Concepts
 Total Engine Concepts MM CB-40

Trace Engines
Trace turbocharged V-8

Train
(Établissements E. Train / Société des Constructions Guinard)
Train 2T
Train 4A
Train 4E
Train 4T
Train 6C
Train 6D
Train 6T

Trebert
 Trebert 60hp 6-cyl rotary barrel engine 
 Trebert 100hp V-8

Tumansky

Tumansky M-87
Tumansky M-88
Tumansky R-11
Tumansky R-13
Tumansky R-15
Tumansky RU-19
Tumansky R-21
Tumansky R-25
Tumansky R-266
Tumansky R-27
Tumansky R-29
Tumansky RD-9

TurbomecaSource:Gunston except where notedTurbomeca Arbizon
Turbomeca Ardiden
Turbomeca Arrius
Turbomeca Arrius (1950s)
Turbomeca Arriel
Turbomeca Artouste
Turbomeca Aspin
Turbomeca Astazou
Turbomeca Astafan
Turbomeca Aubisque
Turbomeca Autan
Turbomeca Bastan
Turbomeca Bi-Bastan – paired Bastan IV
Turbomeca Gabizo
Turbomeca Gourdon
Turbomeca Makila
Turbomeca Marboré
Turbomeca Marcadau
Turbomeca Orédon (1947) Turbomeca's first gas turbine ca 1948; name reused in 1965
Turbomeca Ossau
Turbomeca Palas
Turbomeca Palouste
Turbomeca Piméné
Turbomeca Soular (Soulor?)
Turbomeca Super Palas
Turbomeca Tramontane
Turbomeca Turmo I (turboshaft)
Turbomeca Turmo II (turboshaft)
Turbomeca Turmo III (turboshaft)
Turbomeca Turmastazou
Turbomeca Double Turmastazou
Turbomeca TM251
Turbomeca TM319
Turbomeca TM333
Turbomeca Agusta TAA230
Turbomeca/SNECMA Larzac
Rolls-Royce/Turbomeca RTM321
Rolls-Royce/Turbomeca RTM322
Rolls-Royce/Turbomeca Adour
Rolls-Royce/Turbomeca Orédon
MAN/Rolls-Royce/Turboméca MTR390
MTU/Turbomeca MTM385

Turbo Research
Turbo Research was taken over by Avro Canada

Turbo Research TR.1 – abandoned design study
Turbo Research TR.2 – abandoned design study
Turbo Research TR.3 – abandoned design study
Turbo Research TR.4 – see Avro Canada Chinook
Turbo Research TR.5 – see Avro Canada Orenda

Turbo-Union
Turbo-Union was a joint venture between Rolls-Royce Ltd, MTU and Aeritalia to produce engine for Panavia Tornado 
Turbo-Union RB199

Twombly Motor Company
Twombly Motor Company  (Willard Irving Twombly)

U

Ufimtsev
(A.G. Ufimtsev)
Ufimtsev 1908 20hp 2-cyl 2-stroke rotary
Ufimtsev 1910 35-40hp 4-cyl contra-rotating rotary
Ufimtsev ADU-4 – 60 hp 6-cyl contra-rotating rotary

ULPower

ULPower UL260i
ULPower UL350i
ULPower UL390i
ULPower UL520i

Union
(Union Gas Engine Company, United States)
Union 120hp 6-cyl in-line 

Ursinus
(Ursinus Leichtmotorenbau)
 Ursinus U.1
 Ursinus U.2

UTC
(United Technology Corporation)
 UTC P-1

V

Valley
(Valley Engineering)
 Valley 1915cc
 Valley 2276cc

Van Blerck
(Van Blerck Motor Co., Monroe, Michigan)
Van Blerck 124hp V-8
Van Blerck 135hp V-8 
Van Blerck 185hp V-12 

Vaslin
(Henri Vaslin)
 Vaslin 15hp  flat-4
 Vaslin 24hp 
 Vaslin 55hp  6 in-line water-cooled

Vauxhall
(Vauxhall Motors Ltd.)
 Vauxhall 175hp V-12 

Vaxell

Vaxell 60i
Vaxell 80i
Vaxell 100i

Vedeneyev
Vedeneyev M14P

Velie

Velie M-5
Velie L-9

Verdet
Verdet 55hp 7-cyl rotary 

Vereinegung Volkseigener Betriebe FlugzeugbauSee: PirnaVerner MotorSource: RMV, Verner Motor range of engines,

Verner Scarlett mini 3 – 3 cyl radial
Verner Scarlett mini 5 – 5 cyl radial
Verner Scarlett 7H – 7 cyl radial
Verner Scarlett 36Hi
Verner JCV 360
Verner VM 125
Verner VM 133
Verner VM 144Hi
Verner VM 1400
Verner Scarlett 3V
Verner Scarlett 5V
Verner Scarlett 5Si
Verner Scarlett 7U
Verner Scarlett 9S

Viale

Viale 35 hp (1910 35-50 hp 5-cyl. radial)
Viale 30hp 3-cyl fan 
Viale 50hp 5-cyl radial 
Viale 70hp 7-cyl radial 
Viale 100hp 10-cyl radial 

VIJA

VIJA J-10Si
VIJA J-10Sbi
VIJA AG-12Si
VIJA AG-12Sbi
VIJA J-16Ti

Viking
(Viking Aircraft Engines)
 Viking 100
 Viking 110

Viking
(Detroit Manufacturers Syndicate Inc)
Viking 140hp X-16 

Villiers-Hay
(Villiers-Hay Development Ltd.)
Villiers-Hay 4-L-318 Maya I
Villiers-Hay 4-L-319 Maya II

Vittorazi
(Morrovalle, Italy)
Vittorazi Easy 100 Plus
Vittorazi Fly 100 Evo 2
Vittorazi Moster 185

VivinusData from:Vivinus 32.5hp 4-cyl in-line 
Vivinus 37.5hp 4-cyl in-line 
Vivinus 39.2hp 4-cyl in-line 
Vivinus 50hp 4-cyl in-line 
Vivinus 60hp 4-cyl in-line 
Vivinus 70hp 4-cyl in-line

Volkswagen

 1/2 VW

Volvo Aero

RM1
RM2 – licence built de Havilland Ghost
RM3
RM4
RM5, RM6 – licence built Rolls-Royce Avon
Volvo RM8 – modified Pratt_&_Whitney_JT8D
Volvo RM12 – variant of General Electric F404

von Behren
von Behren O-113 Air Horse

Voronezh
(Voronezh engine factory)
Voronezh MV-6

W

Wackett

Source: RMV
Wackett 2-cylinder 20/25hp
Wackett 2-cylinder 40hp
Wackett Victa 1-cylinder 1924

Walter Aircraft Engines

Walter A
Walter 108H
Walter 110H
Walter W.III – licensed BMW IIIa
Walter W.IV – licensed BMW IV
Walter W.V – licensed Fiat A.20
Walter W.VI – licensed Fiat A.22
Walter W.VII -licensed Fiat A.24
Walter W.VIII – licensed Fiat A.25
Walter H80
Walter NZ 40
Walter NZ 60
Walter NZ 85
Walter NZ 120
Walter M05 – Rolls-Royce Nene
Walter M06 – Klimov VK-1
Walter M701
Walter M202
Walter M208
Walter M332
Walter M337
Walter M436
Walter M462
Walter M466
Walter M601
Walter M602
Walter M701
Walter Junior
Walter Mikron
Walter Minor 4
Walter Minor 6
Walter Minor 12 I-MR
Walter Major 4-1
Walter Major 6-1
Walter Atlas
Walter Atom
Walter Bora
Walter Castor
Walter Gemma
Walter Jupiter – licensed Bristol Jupiter
Walter Merkur – licensed Bristol Mercury
Walter Mars – licensed Gnome-Rhône 14M
Walter Mars I
Walter Mira R – licensed and developed Pobjoy R
Walter Mistral K 14 – licensed Gnome-Rhône Mistral Major
Walter Pegas – licensed Bristol Pegasus
Walter Polaris
Walter Pollux
Walter Regulus
Walter Sagitta
Walter Scolar
Walter Super Castor
Walter Vega
Walter Venus

Walter (HWK)

Walter RI-201 "Cold" Take Off Pack
Walter RI-203 "Hot" Take Off Pack
Walter RII.203
Walter RII.211
Walter HWK 109-500
Walter HWK 109-501
Walter HWK 109-507
Walter HWK 109-509
Walter HWK 109-559
Walter HWK 109-719
Walter HWK 109-729 (SV-stoff and R-stoff)
Walter HWK 109-739
Walter Heimatschützer I
Walter Heimatschützer IV
Walter Me.109 Climb Assister

Wankel

Wankel AG LCR – 407 SGti
Wankel AG LCR – 814 TGti

Warbirds-engines
(Cesky znalecky institut sro, Prague, Czech Republic)
Warbirds ASz-62 IR

Warner

Warner Scarab/Super Scarab
Warner Scarab Junior
Warner R-420
Warner R-500
Warner R-550
Warner 145
Warner 165
Warner 185

WASAG
(Westphalisch-Anhaltische Springstoff A.G.)Source: RMVWASAG 109-506
WASAG 109-512
WASAG 109-522
WASAG 109-532

Watson
(Gary Watson of Newcastle, Texas)
 Watson 917cc 1/2 VW

Weir

Weir 2HOA
Weir 40/50hp 4IL

Weiss
(Weiss Manfréd Repülögép- és Motorgyár Rt – Manfréd Weiss Aircraft and Engine works)
Weiss WM Sh 10 – licence built Siemens-Halske Sh 10
Weiss WM Sh 11 – licence built Siemens-Halske Sh 11
Weiss WM Sh 12 – licence built Siemens-Halske Sh 12
Weiss Sport I 100-130 hp air-cooled 4-cylinder inline engines
Weiss Sport II 100-130 hp air-cooled 4-cylinder inline engines
Weiss Sport III 100-130 hp air-cooled 4-cylinder inline engines
Weiss – Bristol Jupiter VI
Weiss MW 9K Mistral (520 hp Gnome-Rhône 9Krsd)
Weiss WM-K-14A (870 hp licence built and modified Gnome-Rhône 14K Mistral Major)
Weiss WM-K-14B (910 hp and 1030 hp licence built and modified Gnome-Rhône 14K Mistral Major)
Weiss-Daimler-Benz DB 605B (for Hungarian built Messerschmitt Me 210Ca-1/C-1s).

Welch
(Welch Aircraft Co)
Welch O-2 (O-135)

Wells & Adams
Wells & Adams 50hp
Wells & Adams 135hp V-8 

Werner
Werner 30hp 4-cyl in-line

Werner & Pfleiderer
 Werner & Pfleiderer 90/95hp 4-cyl inline 
 Werner & Pfleiderer 95hp 4-cyl inverted inline 
 Werner & Pfleiderer 140/150hp 6-cyl inline 
 Werner & Pfleiderer 220hp 8-cyl 

Wessex
 a 130 hp 6-cylinder in-line 

West Engineering
West Engineering XJ38

Westermayer
(Oskar Westermayer)
 Westermayer W-5-33

Western
(Western Enterprise Engine Co)
Western L-7

Westinghouse

Westinghouse J30
Westinghouse J32
Westinghouse J34
Westinghouse J40
Westinghouse J43
Westinghouse J45
Westinghouse J46
Westinghouse J50
Westinghouse J54
Westinghouse J74 (none built?)
Westinghouse J81 (Rolls-Royce Soar)
Westinghouse T30 (25D)
Westinghouse T70
Westinghouse 19XB
Westinghouse 24C
Westinghouse 25D (T30)
Westinghouse 40E
Westinghouse 9.5A/B

Wherry
 Wherry 4-cyl rotary barrel engine

White & PoppeSource: RMVWhite & Poppe 23hp 6-cyl in-line
White & Poppe 130hp V-8 

WhiteheadSource: RMVWhitehead 1910 40hp
Whitehead 1910 75hp

Wickner
Wickner Wicko F

Wiley Post
Wiley Post AL-1000

WilkschSource: RMVWilksch WAM100
Wilksch WAM120
Wilksch WAM160

Williams
a water-cooled 125hp V-8

Williams InternationalSource: RMVWilliams F107 (WR19)
Williams F112
Williams F121
Williams F122
Williams F124
Williams F129 (FJ44)
Williams F415
Williams EJ22
Williams FJ22
Williams FJ33
Williams FJ44
Williams FJX-1
Williams FJX-2
Williams J400 (WR24)
Williams WJ38-5
Williams WJ119
Williams WR2
Williams WR9
Williams WR19
Williams WRC19
Williams WR24
Williams WR27-1
Williams WR34
Williams WR44
Williams WST117
Williams WTS34

Wills
(C. Howard Wills)
 WBB V-4 2-stroke for Sperry aerial torpedo

Winterthur
(The Swiss Locomotive and machine Works)
 Winterthur V-8
 Winterthur V-12

Wisconsin

140hp 6-cyl in-line  
250hp V-12 

Woelfe Aixro
 Woelfe Aixro XF40

Wojcicli
(S.Wojcicli)
Wojcicli 10kg pulsejet
Wojcicli 20kg pulsejet
Wojcicli 40kg pulsejet
Wojcicli 70kg pulsejet
Wojcicli 11kg ramjet
Wojcicli 200kg ramjet

WolseleySource: Lumsden.

Wolseley 30hp 4-cylinder
Wolseley 50hp V-8 air-cooled
Wolseley 54hp V-8 water-cooled 
Wolseley 60 hp, also known as Type C – V-8 water-cooled 
80 hp "Type B"
Wolseley 75hp V-8 air-cooled 
Wolseley 90hp V-8 air-cooled 
Wolseley 90hp V-8 water-cooled 
Wolseley 120/150hp V-8 water-cooled 
Wolseley 1911 Type A V-8
Wolseley 1911 Type D V-8
Wolseley 160hp – 1912 V-8
Wolseley Aquarius, also known as Wolseley AR7
Wolseley Aries, also known as Wolseley AR9
Wolseley Leo
Wolseley Libra
Wolseley Scorpio
Wolseley Viper – licence built Hispano Suiza HS-8
Wolseley Python 
Wolseley Adder

Wright

Wright Model 4
Wright 1903 12hp
Wright 32.5hp 4-cylinder in-line 4.25" x 4.33"
Wright 30/35hp 4-cyl in-line 
Wright 50hp 6-cyl in-line 
Wright 60hp V-8 
Wright 1910 50-60hp
Wright 6-60 60 hp 6IL 
Wright R-460
Wright R-540 Whirlwind 
Wright R-760 Whirlwind 
Wright R-790 Whirlwind 
Wright R-975 Whirlwind 
Wright R-1200 Simoon
Wright R-1300 Cyclone 7 
Wright R-1454 (R-1)
Wright R-1510  Whirlwind 14Wright R-1670
Wright R-1750 Cyclone 9Wright R-1820 Cyclone 
Wright R-2160 Tornado
Wright R-2600 Twin Cyclone 
Wright R-3350 Duplex-Cyclone 
Wright R-4090 Cyclone 22
Wright Gale (from Lawrance L-4)
Wright V-720
Wright IV-1460
Wright IV-1560
Wright V-1950 Tornado
Wright H-2120 12 cylinder liquid cooled radial
Wright XH-4240
Wright D-1
Wright F-50 Cyclone
Wright F-60 Cyclone
Wright G Cyclone
Wright G-100
Wright G-200
Wright GTC-1
Wright J-1
Wright J-3 Whirlwind
Wright J-4 Whirlwind
Wright J-5 Whirlwind
Wright J-6 Whirlwind 5
Wright J-6 Whirlwind 7
Wright J-6 Whirlwind 9
Wright K-2
Wright P-1
Wright P-2
Wright R-1 (R-1454) 
Wright T
Wright T-1
Wright T-2
Wright T-3 Tornado
Wright T-3A Tornado (V-1950)
Wright T-4
Wright TJ-6
Wright TJ-7
Wright TJA-1
Wright TJ-38A1 Commercial (Olympus 6)
Wright TP-51A2
Wright J51
Wright J59
Wright J61
Wright J65 (Armstrong-Siddeley Sapphire)
Wright J67 (Bristol Olympus)
Wright T35 (from Lockheed J37)
Wright T43
Wright T47 (Olympus turboprop ~10,500shp) 
Wright T49 (Sapphire turboprop ~6,500–10,380ehp)

Wright Company

Wright Vertical 4

Wright-Gypsy
Wright-Gypsy L-320

Wright-Hisso
(Wright-Martin/Wright-Hisso)
Wright-Hisso A
Wright-Hisso B 4-cyl in-line water-cooled  
Wright-Hisso C   geared A
Wright-Hisso D   geared A with cannon
Wright-Hisso E  (HC 'I')
Wright-Hisso E-2 (HC 'E')
Wright-Hisso E-3
Wright-Hisso E-4
Wright-Hisso F ('D' without cannon)
Wright-Hisso H 
Wright-Hisso H-2 improved 'H'
Wright-Hisso I
Wright-Hisso K H with 37mm Baldwin cannon
Wright-Hisso K-2
Wright-Hisso M experimental 300 hp
Wright-Hisso T
Wright-Hisso 180hp V-8 direct drive
Wright-Hisso 220hp V-8 geared drive
Wright-Hisso 300hp V-8 geared drive

Wright-Morehouse
Wright-Morehouse 2-cyl horizontally opposed 26hp (Lincoln Rocket)

Wright-Siemens
Wright-Siemens Sh-14

Wright-Tuttle
Wright-Tuttle WT-5

Wynne
(William Wynne)
(The Corvair Authority)
 Wynne O-164B 100 HP
 Wynne O-164-BE 110 HP
 Wynne TSIO-164-BE 145 HP

X

XCOR Aerospace

XCOR XR-4A3
XCOR XR-4K14

Xian

Xian WS-9 ("Qinling")
Xian WS-15 ("Emei")

Y

Yamaha

Yamaha KT100

York
(Jo York)
York 4-cyl in-line

Yuneec International

Yuneec Power Drive 10
Yuneec Power Drive 20
Yuneec Power Drive 40
Yuneec Power Drive 60

Z

Zanzottera
Zanzottera MZ 34
Zanzottera MZ 100
Zanzottera MZ 201
Zanzottera MZ 202
Zanzottera MZ 301
Zanzottera MZ 313

Z.B.
(Ceskoslovenska Zbrojovka A.S. Brno / Zbrojovka Brno)
 Z.B. ZOD-260

Zeitlin
(Joseph Zeitlin)
 Zeitlin 220hp 7-cyl rotary  bore, variable stroke

Zenoah
Zenoah G-25
Zenoah G-50
Zenoah G-72

Zhuzhou
(Zhuzhou Aeroengine Factory -ZEF now South Motive Power and Machinery Complex (SMPMC))
ZEF HS-5
ZEF HS-6
ZEF WZ-8
ZEF WZ-9
ZEF WZ-16

ZlinSource:Zlin Persy
Zlin Persy II
Zlin Persy III
Zlin Toma 4
Zlin Toma 6

Zoche

Zoche Z 01
Zoche Z 02
Zoche Z 03
Zoche Z 04

ZOD
(Československá zbrojovka Brno'' – ZOD)
 ZOD-240 (2-stroke radial)
 ZOD-260 (2-stroke radial)

Zündapp

Zündapp 9-090
Zündapp 9-092

See also
United States military aircraft engine designations

Notes

References

Further reading

External links

Zlin Website

Lists of aircraft engines